The history of Europe is traditionally divided into four time periods: prehistoric Europe (prior to about 800 BC), classical antiquity (800 BC to AD 500), the Middle Ages (AD 500 to AD 1500), and the modern era (since AD 1500).

The first early European modern humans appear in the fossil record about 48,000 years ago, during the Paleolithic Era. People from this period left behind numerous artifacts, including works of art, burial sites, and tools, allowing some reconstruction of their society. Settled agriculture marked the Neolithic Era, which spread slowly across Europe from southeast to the north and west. The later Neolithic period saw the introduction of early metallurgy and the use of copper-based tools and weapons, and the building of megalithic structures, as exemplified by Stonehenge. During the Indo-European migrations, Europe saw migrations from the east and southeast.

The period known as classical antiquity began with the emergence of the city-states of ancient Greece. Some of the earliest examples of literature, history, and philosophy come from the writings of the ancient Greeks, such as Homer, Herodotus, and Plato. Later, the Roman Empire came to dominate the entire Mediterranean basin. The Migration Period of the Germanic people began in the late 4th century AD and made gradual incursions into various parts of the Roman Empire. As these migratory people settled down and formed state societies of their own, this marked the transition period out of the classical era.

The Fall of the Western Roman Empire in AD 476 traditionally marks the start of the Middle Ages. While the Eastern Roman Empire would persist for another 1000 years, the former lands of the Western Empire would be fragmented into a number of different states. At the same time, the early Slavs began to become established as a distinct group in the central and eastern parts of Europe. The first great empire of the Middle Ages was the Frankish Empire of Charlemagne, while the Islamic conquest of Iberia established Al-Andalus. The Viking Age saw a second great migration of Norse peoples. Attempts to retake the Levant from the Muslim states that occupied it made the High Middle Ages the age of The Crusades, while the political system of feudalism came to its height. The Late Middle Ages were marked by large population declines, as Europe was threatened by the Bubonic Plague, as well as invasions by the Mongol peoples from the Eurasian Steppe. At the end of the Middle Ages, there was a transitional period, known as the Renaissance.

Early Modern Europe is usually dated to the end of the 15th century. Technological changes such as gunpowder and the printing press changed how warfare was conducted and how knowledge was preserved and disseminated. The Protestant Reformation saw the fragmentation of religious thought, leading to religious wars. The Age of Exploration led to colonization, and the exploitation of the people and resources of colonies brought resources and wealth to Europe. After 1800, the Industrial Revolution brought capital accumulation and rapid urbanization to Western Europe, while several countries transitioned away from absolutist rule to parliamentary regimes. The Age of Revolutions saw long-established political systems upset and turned over. In the 20th century, World War I led to a remaking of the map of Europe as the large Empires were broken up into nation-states. Lingering political issues would lead to World War II, during which Nazi Germany perpetrated the Holocaust. After World War II, during the Cold War, most of Europe became divided by the Iron Curtain in two military blocs: NATO and the Warsaw Pact. The post-war period saw decolonization as Western European colonial empires were dismantled. The post-war period also featured the gradual development of the European integration process, which led to the creation of the European Union; this extended to Eastern European countries after the Fall of the Berlin Wall. The 21st century saw the European debt crisis and the withdrawal of the United Kingdom from the European Union.

Overview

During the Neolithic era (starting at c. 7000 BC) and the time of the Indo-European migrations (starting at c. 4000 BC.) Europe saw massive migrations from the east and southeast which also brought agriculture, new technologies, and the Indo-European languages, primarily through the areas of the Balkan peninsula and the Black sea region.

Some of the best-known civilizations of the late prehistoric Europe were the Minoan and the Mycenaean, which flourished during the Bronze Age until they collapsed in a short period of time around 1200 BC.

The period known as classical antiquity began with the emergence of the city-states of Ancient Greece. After ultimately checking the Persian advance in Europe through the Greco-Persian Wars in the 5th century BC, Greek influence reached its zenith under the expansive empire of Alexander the Great, spreading throughout Asia, Africa, and other parts of Europe.

The Thracians, their powerful Odrysian kingdom, distinct culture and architecture were long present in Southeast Europe.

The Roman Empire came to dominate the entire Mediterranean basin. By 300 AD the Roman Empire was divided into the Western and Eastern empires. During the 4th and 5th centuries, the Germanic peoples of Northern Europe, pressed by the Huns, grew in strength and led repeated attacks that resulted in the Fall of the Western Roman Empire. The Western empire's collapse in AD 476 traditionally marks the end of the classical period and the start of the Middle Ages.

In Western Europe, Germanic peoples became more powerful in the remnants of the former Western Roman Empire and established kingdoms and empires of their own. Of all of the Germanic peoples, the Franks would rise to a position of hegemony over Western Europe, the Frankish Empire reaching its peak under Charlemagne around 800. This empire was later divided into several parts; West Francia would evolve into the Kingdom of France, while East Francia would evolve into the Holy Roman Empire, a precursor to modern Germany and Italy. The British Isles were the site of several large-scale migrations.

The Byzantine Empire – the eastern part of the Roman Empire, with its capital Constantinople, survived for the next 1000 years. During most of its existence, the empire was the  most dominant of all, and also the most powerful economic, cultural, and military force in Europe. The powerful and long lived Bulgarian Empire was its main competitor in the region of Southeast Europe for centuries. Byzantine art, architecture, political dominance, and Bulgarian cultural and linguistic achievements left great legacy in Orthodox and Slavic Europe and beyond through the Middle Ages to this day.

The Viking Age, a period of migrations of Scandinavian peoples, occurred from the late 8th century to the middle 11th century. The Normans, descendants of the Vikings who settled in Northern France, had a significant impact on many parts of Europe, from the Norman conquest of England to Sicily. The Rus' people founded Kievan Rus', which evolved into Russia. After 1000 the Crusades were a series of religiously motivated military expeditions originally intended to bring the Levant back under Christian rule. The Crusaders opened trade routes which enabled the merchant republics of Genoa and Venice to become major economic powers. The Reconquista, a related movement, worked to reconquer Iberia for Christendom.

Eastern Europe in the High Middle Ages was dominated by the rise and fall of the Mongol Empire. Led by Genghis Khan, the Mongols were a group of steppe nomads who established a decentralized empire which, at its height, extended from China in the east to the Black and Baltic Seas in Europe. As Mongol power waned towards the Late Middle Ages, the Grand Duchy of Moscow rose to become the strongest of the numerous Russian principalities and republics and would grow into the Tsardom of Russia in 1547. The Late Middle Ages represented a period of upheaval in Europe. The epidemic known as the Black Death and an associated famine caused demographic catastrophe in Europe as the population plummeted. Dynastic struggles and wars of conquest kept many of the states of Europe at war for much of the period. In Scandinavia, the Kalmar Union dominated the political landscape, while England fought with Scotland in the Wars of Scottish Independence and with France in the Hundred Years' War. In Central Europe, the Polish–Lithuanian Commonwealth became a large territorial empire, while the Holy Roman Empire, which was an elective monarchy, came to be dominated for centuries by the House of Habsburg. Russia continued to expand southward and eastward into former Mongol lands. In the Balkans, the Ottoman Empire overran Byzantine lands, culminating in the Fall of Constantinople in 1453, which historians mark as the end of the Middle Ages.

Beginning in the 14th century in Florence and later spreading through Europe, a Renaissance of knowledge challenged traditional doctrines in science and theology. The rediscovery of classical Greek and Roman knowledge had an enormous liberating effect on intellectuals. Simultaneously, the Protestant Reformation under German Martin Luther questioned Papal authority. Henry VIII seized control of the English Church and its lands. The European religious wars were fought between German and Spanish rulers. The Reconquista ended Muslim rule in Iberia. By the 1490s a series of oceanic explorations marked the Age of Discovery, establishing direct links with Africa, the Americas, and Asia. Religious wars continued to be fought in Europe, until the 1648 Peace of Westphalia. The Spanish crown maintained its hegemony in Europe and was the leading power on the continent until the signing of the Treaty of the Pyrenees, which ended a conflict between Spain and France that had begun during the Thirty Years' War. An unprecedented series of major wars and political revolutions took place around Europe and the world in the period between 1610 and 1700.

The Industrial Revolution began in Britain, based on coal, steam, and textile mills. Political change in continental Europe was spurred by the French Revolution under the motto liberté, égalité, fraternité. Napoleon Bonaparte took control, made many reforms inside France, and transformed Western Europe. But his rise stimulated both nationalism and reaction and he was defeated in 1814–15 as the old royal conservatives returned to power.

The period between 1815 and 1871 saw revolutionary attempts in much of Europe (apart from Britain). They all failed however. As industrial work forces grew in Western Europe, socialism and trade union activity developed. The last vestiges of serfdom were abolished in Russia in 1861. Greece and the other Balkan nations began a long slow road to independence from the Ottoman Empire, starting in the 1820s. Italy was unified in its Risorgimento in 1860. After the Franco-Prussian War of 1870–71, Otto von Bismarck unified the German states into an empire that was politically and militarily dominant until 1914. Most of Europe scrambled for imperial colonies in Africa and Asia in the Age of Empire. Britain and France built the largest empires, while diplomats ensured there were no major wars in Europe, apart from the Crimean War of the 1850s.

The outbreak of the First World War in 1914 was precipitated by the rise of nationalism in Southeastern Europe as the Great Powers took sides. The 1917 October Revolution led the Russian Empire to become the world's first communist state, the Soviet Union. The Allies, led by Britain, France, and the United States, defeated the Central Powers, led by the German Empire and Austria-Hungary, in 1918. During the Paris Peace Conference the Big Four imposed their terms in a series of treaties, especially the Treaty of Versailles. The war's human and material devastation was unprecedented.

Germany lost its overseas empire and several provinces, had to pay large reparations, and was humiliated by the victors. They in turn had large debts to the United States. The 1920s were prosperous until 1929 when the Great Depression broke out, which led to the collapse of democracy in many European states. The Nazi regime under Adolf Hitler came to power in 1933, rearmed Germany, and along with Mussolini's Italy sought to assert themselves on the continent. Other nations, who had not taken to the attractions of fascism, sought to avoid conflict. They set boundaries of appeasement, which Hitler continually ignored. The Second World War began. The war ended with the defeat of the Axis powers but the threat of more conflict was recognised before the war's end. Many from the US were suspicious of how the USSR would treat the peace – in the USSR there was paranoia at US forces in Europe. Eastern Front/Western Front meetings among leaders in Yalta proved inconclusive. In the closing months of the war there was a race to the finish. The territories liberated from the Nazis by troops from the USSR found they had exchanged fascism for socialism. The USSR, however, would not leave those territories for forty years. The USSR claimed they needed buffer states between them and the nascent NATO. In the west, the term Iron Curtain entered the language. The United States launched the Marshall Plan from 1948 to 1951 and NATO from 1949, and rebuilt industrial economies that all were thriving by the 1950s. France and West Germany took the lead in forming the European Economic Community, which eventually became the European Union (EU). Secularization saw the weakening of Protestant and Catholic churches across most of Europe, except where they were symbols of reaction, as in Poland. The Revolutions of 1989 brought an end to both Soviet hegemony and socialism in Eastern Europe, the resulting capitalist restoration engendering economic and social devastation for the people. Germany was reunited, Europe's integration deepened, and both NATO and the EU expanded to the east. The EU came under increasing pressure because of the worldwide recession after 2008.

Prehistory of Europe

Paleolithic 

Homo erectus migrated from Africa to Europe before the emergence of modern humans. Homo erectus georgicus, which lived roughly 1.8 million years ago in Georgia, is the earliest hominid to have been discovered in Europe. Lézignan-la-Cèbe in France, Orce in Spain, Monte Poggiolo in Italy and Kozarnika in Bulgaria are among the oldest Palaeolithic sites in Europe.

The earliest appearance of anatomically modern people in Europe has been dated to 45,000 BC, referred to as the Early European modern humans. The earliest sites in Europe are
Riparo Mochi (Italy), Geissenklösterle (Germany), and Isturitz (France).
Some locally developed transitional cultures (Uluzzian in Italy and Greece, Altmühlian in Germany, Szeletian in Central Europe and Châtelperronian in the southwest) use clearly Upper Palaeolithic technologies at very early dates.

Nevertheless, the definitive advance of these technologies is made by the Aurignacian culture. The origins of this culture can be located in the Levant (Ahmarian) and Hungary (first full Aurignacian). By 35,000 BC, the Aurignacian culture and its technology had extended through most of Europe. The last Neanderthals seem to have been forced to retreat during this process to the southern half of the Iberian Peninsula.

Around 29,000 BC a new technology/culture appeared in the western region of Europe: the Gravettian. This technology/culture has been theorised to have come with migrations of people from the Balkans (see Kozarnika).

Around 16,000 BC, Europe witnessed the appearance of a new culture, known as Magdalenian, possibly rooted in the old Gravettian. This culture soon superseded the Solutrean area and the Gravettian of mainly France, Spain, Germany, Italy, Poland, Portugal and Ukraine. The Hamburg culture prevailed in Northern Europe in the 14th and the 13th millennium BC as the Creswellian (also termed the British Late Magdalenian) did shortly after in the British Isles.
Around 12,500 BC, the Würm glaciation ended. Slowly, through the following millennia, temperatures and sea levels rose, changing the environment of prehistoric people. Nevertheless, Magdalenian culture persisted until c. 10,000 BC, when it quickly evolved into two microlithist cultures: Azilian (Federmesser), in Spain and southern France, and then Sauveterrian, in southern France and Tardenoisian in Central Europe, while in Northern Europe the Lyngby complex succeeded the Hamburg culture with the influence of the Federmesser group as well.

Neolithic and Copper Age

Evidence of permanent settlement dates from the 8th millennium BC in the Balkans. The Neolithic reached Central Europe in the 6th millennium BC and parts of Northern Europe in the 5th and 4th millenniums BC. The modern indigenous populations of Europe are largely descended from three distinct lineages: Mesolithic hunter-gatherers, a derivative of the Cro-Magnon population of Europe, Early European Farmers who migrated from Anatolia during the Neolithic Revolution, and Yamnaya pastoralists who expanded into Europe in the context of the Indo-European expansion. The genetic makeup of speakers of the Uralic language family in northern Europe was shaped by migration from Siberia that began at least 3,500 years ago.

The Indo-European migrations started at around c. 4200 BC. through the areas of the Black sea and the Balkan peninsula in East and Southeast Europe. In the next 3000 years the Indo-European languages expanded through Europe. Around this time, in 4700 – 4200 BC, the Solnitsata town, believed to be the oldest prehistoric town in Europe, flourished.

In the Varna Necropolis – a burial site from 4569 to 4340 BC and one of the most important archaeological sites in world prehistory, was found the oldest gold treasure (elaborated golden objects) in the world. Recently discovered golden artifacts in another site in Bulgaria near Durankulak appear to be 7,000 years old. Several prehistoric Bulgarian finds are considered no less old – the golden treasures of Hotnitsa, artifacts from the Kurgan settlement of Yunatsite near Pazardzhik, the golden treasure Sakar, as well as beads and gold jewelry found in the Kurgan settlement of Provadia – Solnitsata (“salt pit”). However, Varna gold is most often called the oldest since this treasure is the largest and most diverse.

Ancient Europe

Bronze Age

The first well-known literate civilization in Europe was that of the Minoans. The Minoan civilization was a Bronze Age civilization that arose on the island of Crete and flourished from approximately the 27th century BC to the 15th century BC. It was rediscovered at the beginning of the 20th century through the work of the British archaeologist Arthur Evans. Will Durant referred to it as "the first link in the European chain".

The Minoans were replaced by the Mycenaean civilization which flourished during the period roughly between 1600 BC, when Helladic culture in mainland Greece was transformed under influences from Minoan Crete, and 1100 BC. The major Mycenaean cities were Mycenae and Tiryns in Argolis, Pylos in Messenia, Athens in Attica, Thebes and Orchomenus in Boeotia, and Iolkos in Thessaly. In Crete, the Mycenaeans occupied Knossos. Mycenaean settlement sites also appeared in Epirus, Macedonia, on islands in the Aegean Sea, on the coast of Asia Minor, the Levant, Cyprus and Italy. Mycenaean artefacts have been found well outside the limits of the Mycenean world.

Quite unlike the Minoans, whose society benefited from trade, the Mycenaeans advanced through conquest. Mycenaean civilization was dominated by a warrior aristocracy. Around 1400 BC, the Mycenaeans extended their control to Crete, the centre of the Minoan civilization, and adopted a form of the Minoan script (called Linear A) to write their early form of Greek in Linear B.

The Mycenaean civilization perished with the collapse of Bronze-Age civilization on the eastern shores of the Mediterranean Sea. The collapse is commonly attributed to the Dorian invasion, although other theories describing natural disasters and climate change have been advanced as well. Whatever the causes, the Mycenaean civilization had definitely disappeared after LH III C, when the sites of Mycenae and Tiryns were again destroyed and lost their importance. This end, during the last years of the 12th century BC, occurred after a slow decline of the Mycenaean civilization, which lasted many years before dying out. The beginning of the 11th century BC opened a new context, that of the protogeometric, the beginning of the geometric period, the Greek Dark Ages of traditional historiography.

Classical Antiquity

The Greeks and the Romans left a legacy in Europe which is evident in European languages, thought, visual arts and law. Ancient Greece was a collection of city-states, out of which the original form of democracy developed. Athens was the most powerful and developed city, and a cradle of learning from the time of Pericles. Citizens' forums debated and legislated policy of the state, and from here arose some of the most notable classical philosophers, such as Socrates, Plato, and Aristotle, the last of whom taught Alexander the Great.

Through his military campaigns, the king of the kingdom of Macedon, Alexander, spread Hellenistic culture and learning to the banks of the River Indus. Meanwhile, the Roman Republic strengthened through victory over Carthage in the Punic Wars. Greek wisdom passed into Roman institutions, as Athens itself was absorbed under the banner of the Senate and People of Rome (SPQR).

The Romans expanded their domains from Anatolia in the east to Britannia in the west. In 44 BC as it approached its height, its dictator Julius Caesar was murdered by senators in an attempt to restore the Republic. In the ensuing turmoil, Octavian (ruled as Augustus; and as divi filius, or Son of God, as Julius had adopted him as an heir) usurped the reins of power and fought the Roman Senate. While proclaiming the rebirth of the Republic, he had ushered in the transfer of the Roman state from a republic to an empire, the Roman Empire, which lasted for nearly 15 centuries until the fall of the Eastern Roman Empire.

Ancient Greece

The Hellenic civilisation was a collection of city-states or poleis with different governments and cultures that achieved notable developments in government, philosophy, science, mathematics, politics, sports, theatre and music.

The most powerful city-states were Athens, Sparta, Thebes, Corinth, and Syracuse. Athens was a powerful Hellenic city-state and governed itself with an early form of direct democracy invented by Cleisthenes; the citizens of Athens voted on legislation and executive bills themselves. Athens was the home of Socrates, Plato, and the Platonic Academy.

The Hellenic city-states established colonies on the shores of the Black Sea and the Mediterranean Sea (Asian Minor, Sicily, and Southern Italy in Magna Graecia). By the late 6th century BC, all the Greek city states in Asia Minor had been incorporated into the Persian Empire, while the latter had made territorial gains in the Balkans (such as Macedon, Thrace, Paeonia, etc.) and Eastern Europe proper as well. In the course of the 5th century BC, some of the Greek city states attempted to overthrow Persian rule in the Ionian Revolt, which failed. This sparked the first Persian invasion of mainland Greece. At some point during the ensuing Greco-Persian Wars, namely during the Second Persian invasion of Greece, and precisely after the Battle of Thermopylae and the Battle of Artemisium, almost all of Greece to the north of the Isthmus of Corinth had been overrun by the Persians, but the Greek city states reached a decisive victory at the Battle of Plataea. With the end of the Greco-Persian wars, the Persians were eventually decisively forced to withdraw from their territories in Europe. The Greco-Persian Wars and the victory of the Greek city states directly influenced the entire further course of European history and would set its further tone. Some Greek city-states formed the Delian League to continue fighting Persia, but Athens' position as leader of this league led Sparta to form the rival Peloponnesian League. The Peloponnesian Wars ensued, and the Peloponnesian League was victorious. Subsequently, discontent with Spartan hegemony led to the Corinthian War and the defeat of Sparta at the Battle of Leuctra. At the same time at the north ruled the Thracian Odrysian Kingdom between the 5th century BC and the 1st century AD.

Hellenic infighting left Greek city states vulnerable, and Philip II of Macedon united the Greek city states under his control. The son of Philip II, known as Alexander the Great, invaded neighboring Persia, toppled and incorporated its domains, as well as invading Egypt and going as far off as India, increasing contact with people and cultures in these regions that marked the beginning of the Hellenistic period.

After the death of Alexander the Great, his empire split into multiple kingdoms ruled by his generals, the Diadochi. The Diadochi fought against each other in a series of conflicts called the Wars of the Diadochi. In the beginning of the 2nd century BC, only three major kingdoms remained: the Ptolemaic Egypt, the Seleucid Empire and Macedonia. These kingdoms spread Greek culture to regions as far away as Bactria.

Ancient Rome

The rise of Rome

Much of Greek learning was assimilated by the nascent Roman state as it expanded outward from Italy, taking advantage of its enemies' inability to unite: the only challenge to Roman ascent came from the Phoenician colony of Carthage, and its defeats in the three Punic Wars marked the start of Roman hegemony. First governed by kings, then as a senatorial republic (the Roman Republic), Rome finally became an empire at the end of the 1st century BC, under Augustus and his authoritarian successors.

The Roman Empire had its centre in the Mediterranean, controlling all the countries on its shores; the northern border was marked by the Rhine and Danube rivers. Pax Romana, a period of peace, civilisation and an efficient centralised government in the subject territories ended in the 3rd century, when a series of civil wars undermined Rome's economic and social strength.

In the 4th century, the emperors Diocletian and Constantine were able to slow down the process of decline by splitting the empire into a Western part with a capital in Rome and an Eastern part with the capital in Byzantium, or Constantinople (now Istanbul). Constantinople is generally considered to be the center of "Eastern Orthodox civilization". Whereas Diocletian severely persecuted Christianity, Constantine declared an official end to state-sponsored persecution of Christians in 313 with the Edict of Milan, thus setting the stage for the Church to become the state church of the Roman Empire in about 380.

Decline of the Roman Empire

The Roman Empire had been repeatedly attacked by invading armies from Northern Europe and in 476, Rome finally fell. Romulus Augustus, the last emperor of the Western Roman Empire, surrendered to the Germanic King Odoacer. The British historian Edward Gibbon argued in The History of the Decline and Fall of the Roman Empire (1776) that the Romans had become decadent and had lost civic virtue.

Gibbon said that the adoption of Christianity meant belief in a better life after death, and therefore made people lazy and indifferent to the present. "From the eighteenth century onward", Glen W. Bowersock has remarked, "we have been obsessed with the fall: it has been valued as an archetype for every perceived decline, and, hence, as a symbol for our own fears." It remains one of the greatest historical questions, and has a tradition rich in scholarly interest.

Some other notable dates are the Battle of Adrianople in 378, the death of Theodosius I in 395 (the last time the Roman Empire was politically unified), the crossing of the Rhine in 406 by Germanic tribes after the withdrawal of the legions to defend Italy against Alaric I, the death of Stilicho in 408, followed by the disintegration of the western legions, the death of Justinian I, the last Roman emperor who tried to reconquer the west, in 565, and the coming of Islam after 632. Many scholars maintain that rather than a "fall", the changes can more accurately be described as a complex transformation. Over time many theories have been proposed on why the Empire fell, or whether indeed it fell at all.

Late Antiquity and Migration Period

When Emperor Constantine had reconquered Rome under the banner of the cross in 312, he soon afterwards issued the Edict of Milan in 313 (preceded by the Edict of Serdica in 311), declaring the legality of Christianity in the Roman Empire. In addition, Constantine officially shifted the capital of the Roman Empire from Rome to the Greek town of Byzantium, which he renamed Nova Roma – it was later named Constantinople ("City of Constantine").

Theodosius I, who had made Christianity the official religion of the Roman Empire, would be the last emperor to preside over a united Roman Empire, until his death in 395. The empire was split into two-halves: the Western Roman Empire centred in Ravenna, and the Eastern Roman Empire (later to be referred to as the Byzantine Empire) centred in Constantinople. The Roman Empire was repeatedly attacked by Hunnic, Germanic, Slavic and other "barbarian" tribes (see: Migration Period), and in 476 finally the Western part fell to the Heruli chieftain Odoacer.

Roman authority in the Western part of the empire had collapsed, and a power vacuum left in the wake of this collapse; the central organization, institutions, laws and power of Rome had broken down, resulting in many areas being open to invasion by migrating tribes. Over time, feudalism and manorialism arose, two interlocking institutions that provided for division of land and labour, as well as a broad if uneven hierarchy of law and protection. These localised hierarchies were based on the bond of common people to the land on which they worked, and to a lord, who would provide and administer both local law to settle disputes among the peasants, as well as protection from outside invaders. Unlike under Roman rule, with its standard laws and military across the empire and its great bureaucracy to administer them and collect taxes, each lord (although having obligations to a higher lord) was largely sovereign in his domain. A peasant's lot could vary greatly depending on the leadership skills and attitudes to justice of the lord toward his people. Tithes or rents were paid to the lord, who in turn owed resources, and armed men in times of war, to his lord, perhaps a regional prince. However, the levels of hierarchy were varied over time and place.

The western provinces soon were to be dominated by three great powers: first, the Franks (Merovingian dynasty) in Francia 481–843 AD, which covered much of present France and Germany; second, the Visigothic kingdom 418–711 AD in the Iberian Peninsula (modern Spain); and third, the Ostrogothic kingdom 493–553 AD in Italy and parts of the western Balkans. The Ostrogoths were later replaced by the Kingdom of the Lombards 568–774 AD. These new powers of the west built upon the Roman traditions until they evolved into a synthesis of Roman and Germanic cultures. Although these powers covered large territories, they did not have the great resources and bureaucracy of the Roman empire to control regions and localities. The ongoing invasions and boundary disputes usually meant a more risky and varying life than that under the empire. This meant that in general more power and responsibilities were left to local lords. On the other hand, it also meant more freedom, particularly in more remote areas.

In Italy, Theodoric the Great began the cultural romanisation of the new world he had constructed. He made Ravenna a centre of Romano-Greek culture of art and his court fostered a flowering of literature and philosophy in Latin. In Iberia, King Chindasuinth created the Visigothic Code.

In the Eastern part the dominant state was the remaining Eastern Roman Empire.

In the feudal system, new princes and kings arose, the most powerful of which was arguably the Frankish ruler Charlemagne. In 800, Charlemagne, reinforced by his massive territorial conquests, was crowned Emperor of the Romans (Imperator Romanorum) by Pope Leo III, effectively solidifying his power in western Europe. Charlemagne's reign marked the beginning of a new Germanic Roman Empire in the west, the Holy Roman Empire. Outside his borders, new forces were gathering. The Kievan Rus' were marking out their territory, a Great Moravia was growing, while the Angles and the Saxons were securing their borders.

For the duration of the 6th century, the Eastern Roman Empire was embroiled in a series of deadly conflicts, first with the Persian Sassanid Empire (see Roman–Persian Wars), followed by the onslaught of the arising Islamic Caliphate (Rashidun and Umayyad). By 650, the provinces of Egypt, Palestine and Syria were lost to the Muslim forces, followed by Hispania and southern Italy in the 7th and 8th centuries (see Muslim conquests). The Arab invasion from the east was stopped after the intervention of the Bulgarian Empire (see Han Tervel).

Post-classical Europe

The Middle Ages are commonly dated from the fall of the Western Roman Empire (or by some scholars, before that) in the 5th century to the beginning of the early modern period in the 16th century marked by the rise of nation states, the division of Western Christianity in the Reformation, the rise of humanism in the Italian Renaissance, and the beginnings of European overseas expansion which allowed for the Columbian Exchange.

Byzantium

Many consider Emperor Constantine I (reigned 306–337) to be the first "Byzantine emperor". It was he who moved the imperial capital in 324 from Nicomedia to Byzantium, which re-founded as Constantinople, or Nova Roma ("New Rome"). The city of Rome itself had not served as the capital since the reign of Diocletian (284–305). Some date the beginnings of the Empire to the reign of Theodosius I (379–395) and Christianity's official supplanting of the pagan Roman religion, or following his death in 395, when the empire was split into two parts, with capitals in Rome and Constantinople. Others place it yet later in 476, when Romulus Augustulus, traditionally considered the last western emperor, was deposed, thus leaving sole imperial authority with the emperor in the Greek East. Others point to the reorganisation of the empire in the time of Heraclius (c. 620) when Latin titles and usages were officially replaced with Greek versions. In any case, the changeover was gradual and by 330, when Constantine inaugurated his new capital, the process of hellenization and increasing Christianisation was already under way. The Empire is generally considered to have ended after the fall of Constantinople to the Ottoman Turks in 1453. The Plague of Justinian was a pandemic that afflicted the Byzantine Empire, including its capital Constantinople, in the years 541–542. It is estimated that the Plague of Justinian killed as many as 100 million people across the world. It caused Europe's population to drop by around 50% between 541 and 700. It also may have contributed to the success of the Muslim conquests. During most of its existence, the Byzantine Empire was one of the most powerful economic, cultural, and military forces in Europe, and Constantinople was one of the largest and wealthiest cities in Europe.

Early Middle Ages

The Early Middle Ages span roughly five centuries from 500 to 1000.

In the East and Southeast of Europe new dominant states formed: the Avar Khaganate (567–after 822), Old Great Bulgaria (632–668), the Khazar Khaganate (c. 650–969) and Danube Bulgaria (founded by Asparuh in 680) were constantly rivaling the hegemony of the Byzantine Empire.

From the 7th century Byzantine history was greatly affected by the rise of Islam and the Caliphates. Muslim Arabs first invaded historically Roman territory under Abū Bakr, first Caliph of the Rashidun Caliphate, who entered Roman Syria and Roman Mesopotamia. As the Byzantines and neighboring Sasanids were severely weakened by the time, amongst the most important reason(s) being the protracted, centuries-lasting and frequent Byzantine–Sasanian wars, which included the climactic Byzantine–Sasanian War of 602–628, under Umar, the second Caliph, the Muslims entirely toppled the Sasanid Persian Empire, and decisively conquered Syria and Mesopotamia, as well as Roman Palestine, Roman Egypt, and parts of Asia Minor and Roman North Africa. In the mid 7th century AD, following the Muslim conquest of Persia, Islam penetrated into the Caucasus region, of which parts would later permanently become part of Russia. This trend, which included the conquests by the invading Muslim forces and by that the spread of Islam as well continued under Umar's successors and under the Umayyad Caliphate, which conquered the rest of Mediterranean North Africa and most of the Iberian Peninsula. Over the next centuries Muslim forces were able to take further European territory, including Cyprus, Malta, Crete, and Sicily and parts of southern Italy.

The Muslim conquest of Hispania began when the Moors (Berbers and Arabs) invaded the Christian Visigothic kingdom of Hispania in the year 711, under the Berber general Tariq ibn Ziyad. They landed at Gibraltar on 30 April and worked their way northward. Tariq's forces were joined the next year by those of his Arab superior, Musa ibn Nusair. During the eight-year campaign most of the Iberian Peninsula was brought under Muslim rule – save for small areas in the northwest (Asturias) and largely Basque regions in the Pyrenees. In 711, Visigothic Hispania was very weakened because it was immersed in a serious internal crisis caused by a war of succession to the throne involving two Visigoth suitors. The Muslims took advantage of the crisis within the Hispano-Visigothic society to carry out their conquests. This territory, under the Arab name Al-Andalus, became part of the expanding Umayyad empire.

The second siege of Constantinople (717) ended unsuccessfully after the intervention of Tervel of Bulgaria and weakened the Umayyad dynasty and reduced their prestige. In 722 Don Pelayo, a nobleman of Visigothic origin, formed an army of 300 Astur soldiers, to confront Munuza's Muslim troops. In the battle of Covadonga, the Astures defeated the Arab-Moors, who decided to retire. The Christian victory marked the beginning of the Reconquista and the establishment of the Kingdom of Asturias, whose first sovereign was Don Pelayo. The conquerors intended to continue their expansion in Europe and move northeast across the Pyrenees, but were defeated by the Frankish leader Charles Martel at the Battle of Poitiers in 732. The Umayyads were overthrown in 750 by the 'Abbāsids, and, in 756, the Umayyads established an independent emirate in the Iberian Peninsula.

Feudal Christendom

The Holy Roman Empire emerged around 800, as Charlemagne, King of the Franks and part of the Carolingian dynasty, was crowned by the pope as emperor. His empire based in modern France, the Low Countries and Germany expanded into modern Hungary, Italy, Bohemia, Lower Saxony and Spain. He and his father received substantial help from an alliance with the Pope, who wanted help against the Lombards. His death marked the beginning of the end of the dynasty, which collapsed entirely by 888. The fragmentation of power led to semi-autonomy in the region, and has been defined as a critical starting point for the formation of states in Europe.

To the east, Bulgaria was established in 681 and became the first Slavic country. The powerful Bulgarian Empire was the main rival of Byzantium for control of the Balkans for centuries and from the 9th century became the cultural centre of Slavic Europe. The Empire created the Cyrillic script during the 9th century AD, at the Preslav Literary School, and experienced the Golden Age of Bulgarian cultural prosperity during the reign of emperor Simeon I the Great (893–927). Two states, Great Moravia and Kievan Rus', emerged among the Slavic peoples respectively in the 9th century. In the late 9th and 10th centuries, northern and western Europe felt the burgeoning power and influence of the Vikings who raided, traded, conquered and settled swiftly and efficiently with their advanced seagoing vessels such as the longships. The Vikings had left a cultural influence on the Anglo-Saxons and Franks as well as the Scots. The Hungarians pillaged mainland Europe, the Pechenegs raided Bulgaria, Rus States and the Arab states. In the 10th century independent kingdoms were established in Central Europe including Poland and the newly settled Kingdom of Hungary. The Kingdom of Croatia also appeared in the Balkans. The subsequent period, ending around 1000, saw the further growth of feudalism, which weakened the Holy Roman Empire.

In eastern Europe, Volga Bulgaria became an Islamic state in 921, after Almış I converted to Islam under the missionary efforts of Ahmad ibn Fadlan.

Slavery in the early medieval period had mostly died out in western Europe by about the year 1000 AD, replaced by serfdom. It lingered longer in England and in peripheral areas linked to the Muslim world, where slavery continued to flourish. Church rules suppressed slavery of Christians. Most historians argue the transition was quite abrupt around 1000, but some see a gradual transition from about 300 to 1000.

High Middle Ages

The slumber of the Dark Ages was shaken by a renewed crisis in the Church. In 1054, the East–West Schism, an insoluble split, occurred between the two remaining Christian seats in Rome and Constantinople (modern Istanbul).

The High Middle Ages of the 11th, 12th, and 13th centuries show a rapidly increasing population of Europe, which caused great social and political change from the preceding era. By 1250, the robust population increase greatly benefited the economy, reaching levels it would not see again in some areas until the 19th century.

From about the year 1000 onwards, Western Europe saw the last of the barbarian invasions and became more politically organized. The Vikings had settled in Britain, Ireland, France and elsewhere, whilst Norse Christian kingdoms were developing in their Scandinavian homelands. The Magyars had ceased their expansion in the 10th century, and by the year 1000, the Roman Catholic Apostolic Kingdom of Hungary was recognised in central Europe. With the brief exception of the Mongol invasions, major barbarian incursions ceased.

Bulgarian sovereignty was re-established with the anti-Byzantine uprising of the Bulgarians and Vlachs in 1185. The crusaders invaded the Byzantine empire, captured Constantinople in 1204 and established their Latin Empire. Kaloyan of Bulgaria defeated Baldwin I, Latin Emperor of Constantinople, in the Battle of Adrianople on 14 April 1205. The reign of Ivan Asen II of Bulgaria led to maximum territorial expansion and that of Ivan Alexander of Bulgaria to a Second Golden Age of Bulgarian culture. The Byzantine Empire was fully re-established in 1261.

In the 11th century, populations north of the Alps began to settle new lands, some of which had reverted to wilderness after the end of the Roman Empire. In what is known as the "great clearances", vast forests and marshes of Europe were cleared and cultivated. At the same time settlements moved beyond the traditional boundaries of the Frankish Empire to new frontiers in Europe, beyond the Elbe river, tripling the size of Germany in the process. Crusaders founded European colonies in the Levant, the majority of the Iberian Peninsula was conquered from the Muslims, and the Normans colonised southern Italy, all part of the major population increase and resettlement pattern.

The High Middle Ages produced many different forms of intellectual, spiritual and artistic works. The most famous are the great cathedrals as expressions of Gothic architecture, which evolved from Romanesque architecture. This age saw the rise of modern nation-states in Western Europe and the ascent of the famous Italian city-states, such as Florence and Venice. The influential popes of the Catholic Church called volunteer armies from across Europe to a series of Crusades against the Seljuq Turks, who occupied the Holy Land. The rediscovery of the works of Aristotle led Thomas Aquinas and other thinkers to develop the philosophy of Scholasticism.

A divided church

The Great Schism between the Western (Catholic) and Eastern (Orthodox) Christian Churches was sparked in 1054 by Pope Leo IX asserting authority over three of the seats in the Pentarchy, in Antioch, Jerusalem and Alexandria. Since the mid-8th century, the Byzantine Empire's borders had been shrinking in the face of Islamic expansion. Antioch had been wrested back into Byzantine control by 1045, but the resurgent power of the Roman successors in the West claimed a right and a duty for the lost seats in Asia and Africa. Pope Leo sparked a further dispute by defending the filioque clause in the Nicene Creed which the West had adopted customarily. The Orthodox today state that the XXVIIIth Canon of the Council of Chalcedon explicitly proclaimed the equality of the Bishops of Rome and Constantinople. The Orthodox also state that the Bishop of Rome has authority only over his own diocese and does not have any authority outside his diocese. There were other less significant catalysts for the Schism however, including variance over liturgy. The Schism of Roman Catholic and Orthodox followed centuries of estrangement between the Latin and Greek worlds.

Holy wars

After the East–West Schism, Western Christianity was adopted by the newly created kingdoms of Central Europe: Poland, Hungary and Bohemia. The Roman Catholic Church developed as a major power, leading to conflicts between the Pope and emperor. The geographic reach of the Roman Catholic Church expanded enormously due to the conversions of pagan kings (Scandinavia, Lithuania, Poland, Hungary), the Christian Reconquista of Al-Andalus, and the crusades. Most of Europe was Roman Catholic in the 15th century.

Early signs of the rebirth of civilization in western Europe began to appear in the 11th century as trade started again in Italy, leading to the economic and cultural growth of independent city-states such as Venice and Florence; at the same time, nation-states began to take form in places such as France, England, Spain, and Portugal, although the process of their formation (usually marked by rivalry between the monarchy, the aristocratic feudal lords and the church) actually took several centuries. These new nation-states began writing in their own cultural vernaculars, instead of the traditional Latin. Notable figures of this movement would include Dante Alighieri and Christine de Pizan (born Christina da Pizzano), the former writing in Italian, and the latter, although an Italian (Venice), relocated to France, writing in French. (See Reconquista for the latter two countries.) Elsewhere, the Holy Roman Empire, essentially based in Germany and Italy, further fragmented into a myriad of feudal principalities or small city states, whose subjection to the emperor was only formal.

The 14th century, when the Mongol Empire came to power, is often called the Age of the Mongols. Mongol armies expanded westward under the command of Batu Khan. Their western conquests included almost all of Russia (save Novgorod, which became a vassal), and the Kipchak-Cuman Confederation. Bulgaria, Hungary, and Poland managed to remain sovereign states. Mongolian records indicate that Batu Khan was planning a complete conquest of the remaining European powers, beginning with a winter attack on Austria, Italy and Germany, when he was recalled to Mongolia upon the death of Great Khan Ögedei. Most historians believe only his death prevented the complete conquest of Europe. The areas of Eastern Europe and most of Central Asia that were under direct Mongol rule became known as the Golden Horde. Under Uzbeg Khan, Islam became the official religion of the region in the early 14th century. The invading Mongols, together with their mostly Turkic subjects, were known as Tatars. In Russia, the Tatars ruled the various states of the Rus' through vassalage for over 300 years.

In the Northern Europe, Konrad of Masovia gave Chełmno to the Teutonic Knights in 1226 as a base for a Crusade against the Old Prussians and Grand Duchy of Lithuania. The Livonian Brothers of the Sword were defeated by the Lithuanians, so in 1237 Gregory IX merged the remainder of the order into the Teutonic Order as the Livonian Order. By the middle of the century, the Teutonic Knights completed their conquest of the Prussians before conquering and converting the Lithuanians in the subsequent decades. The order also came into conflict with the Eastern Orthodox Church of the Pskov and Novgorod Republics. In 1240 the Orthodox Novgorod army defeated the Catholic Swedes in the Battle of the Neva, and, two years later, they defeated the Livonian Order in the Battle on the Ice. The Union of Krewo in 1386, bringing two major changes in the history of the Grand Duchy of Lithuania: conversion to Catholicism and establishment of a dynastic union between the Grand Duchy of Lithuania and the Crown of the Kingdom of Poland marked both the greatest territorial expansion of the Grand Duchy and the defeat of the Teutonic Knights in the Battle of Grunwald in 1410.

Late Middle Ages

The Late Middle Ages spanned around the 14th and late 15th centuries. Around 1300, centuries of European prosperity and growth came to a halt. A series of famines and plagues, such as the Great Famine of 1315–1317 and the Black Death, killed people in a matter of days, reducing the population of some areas by half as many survivors fled. Kishlansky reports:
The Black Death touched every aspect of life, hastening a process of social, economic, and cultural transformation already underway.... Fields were abandoned, workplaces stood idle, international trade was suspended. Traditional bonds of kinship, village, and even religion were broken amid the horrors of death, flight, and failed expectations. "People cared no more for dead men than we care for dead goats," wrote one survivor.

Depopulation caused labor to become scarcer; the survivors were better paid and peasants could drop some of the burdens of feudalism. There was also social unrest; France and England experienced serious peasant risings including the Jacquerie and the Peasants' Revolt. At the same time, the unity of the Catholic Church was shattered by the Great Schism. Collectively these events have been called the Crisis of the Late Middle Ages.

Beginning in the 14th century, the Baltic Sea became one of the most important trade routes. The Hanseatic League, an alliance of trading cities, facilitated the absorption of vast areas of Poland, Lithuania, and Livonia into trade with other European countries. This fed the growth of powerful states in this part of Europe including Poland–Lithuania, Hungary, Bohemia, and Muscovy later on. The conventional end of the Middle Ages is usually associated with the fall of the city of Constantinople and of the Byzantine Empire to the Ottoman Turks in 1453. The Turks made the city the capital of their Ottoman Empire, which lasted until 1922 and included Egypt, Syria, and most of the Balkans. The Ottoman wars in Europe, also sometimes referred to as the Turkish wars, marked an essential part of the history of the continent as a whole.

A key 15th-century development was the advent of the movable type of printing press circa 1439 in Mainz, building upon the impetus provided by the prior introduction of paper from China via the Arabs in the High Middle Ages. Paper was already readily available in Europe by the late 14th century. While forms of moveable type of printing press had been already used in China and Korea, the technique was singularly successful in Europe given the small number of characters of the Latin alphabet, massively reducing costs of book production. The adoption of the technology across the continent at dazzling speed for the remaining part of the 15th century would usher a revolution and by 1500 over 200 cities in Europe had presses that printed between 8 and 20 million books.

Homicide rates plunge over 800 years
At the local level, levels of violence were extremely high by modern standards in medieval and early modern Europe. They actually reached their peak during the late Middle Ages, having increased since the third century. Typically, small groups would battle their neighbors, using the farm tools at hand such as knives, sickles, hammers and axes. Mayhem and death were deliberate. The vast majority of people lived in rural areas. Cities were few, and small in size, but their concentration of population was conducive to violence. Long-term studies of places such as Amsterdam, Stockholm, Venice and Zurich show the same trends as rural areas. Across Europe, homicide trends (not including military actions) show a steady long-term decline. Regional differences were small, except that Italy's decline was later and slower. From approximately 1200 AD through 1800 AD, homicide rates from violent local episodes declined by a factor of ten, from approximately 32 deaths per 100 000 people to 3.2 per 100 000. In the 20th century the homicide rate fell to 1.4 per 100 000. Police forces seldom existed outside the cities; prisons only became common after 1800. Before then harsh penalties were imposed for homicide (severe whipping or execution) but they proved ineffective at controlling or reducing the insults to honor that precipitated most of the violence. The decline does not correlate with economics. Most historians attribute the trend in homicides to a steady increase in self-control of the sort promoted by Protestantism, and necessitated by schools and factories.

Historian Manuel Eisner has summarized the patterns from over 300 historical studies.

Early modern Europe

The Early Modern period spans the centuries between the Middle Ages and the Industrial Revolution, roughly from 1500 to 1800, or from the discovery of the New World in 1492 to the French Revolution in 1789. The period is characterised by the rise in importance of science and increasingly rapid technological progress, secularised civic politics, and the nation state. Capitalist economies began their rise, and the early modern period also saw the rise and dominance of the economic theory of mercantilism. As such, the early modern period represents the decline and eventual disappearance, in much of the European sphere, of feudalism, serfdom and the power of the Catholic Church. The period includes the Renaissance, the Protestant Reformation, the disastrous Thirty Years' War, the European colonisation of the Americas and the European witch-hunts.

Renaissance

Despite these crises, the 14th century was also a time of great progress within the arts and sciences. A renewed interest in ancient Greek and Roman led to the Italian Renaissance.

The Renaissance was a cultural movement that profoundly affected European intellectual life in the early modern period. Beginning in Italy, and spreading to the north, west and middle Europe during a cultural lag of some two and a half centuries, its influence affected literature, philosophy, art, politics, science, history, religion, and other aspects of intellectual inquiry.

The Italian Petrarch (Francesco Petrarca), deemed the first full-blooded Humanist, wrote in the 1330s: "I am alive now, yet I would rather have been born in another time." He was enthusiastic about Greek and Roman antiquity. In the 15th and 16th centuries the continuing enthusiasm for the ancients was reinforced by the feeling that the inherited culture was dissolving and here was a storehouse of ideas and attitudes with which to rebuild. Matteo Palmieri wrote in the 1430s: "Now indeed may every thoughtful spirit thank god that it has been permitted to him to be born in a new age." The renaissance was born: a new age where learning was very important.

The Renaissance was inspired by the growth in the study of Latin and Greek texts and the admiration of the Greco-Roman era as a golden age. This prompted many artists and writers to begin drawing from Roman and Greek examples for their works, but there was also much innovation in this period, especially by multi-faceted artists such as Leonardo da Vinci. The Humanists saw their repossession of a great past as a Renaissance – a rebirth of civilization itself.

Important political precedents were also set in this period. Niccolò Machiavelli's political writing in The Prince influenced later absolutism and realpolitik. Also important were the many patrons who ruled states and used the artistry of the Renaissance as a sign of their power.

In all, the Renaissance could be viewed as an attempt by intellectuals to study and improve the secular and worldly, both through the revival of ideas from antiquity and through novel approaches to thought – the immediate past being too "Gothic" in language, thought and sensibility.

Exploration and trade

Toward the end of the period, an era of discovery began. The growth of the Ottoman Empire, culminating in the fall of Constantinople in 1453, cut off trading possibilities with the east. Western Europe was forced to discover new trading routes, as happened with Columbus' travel to the Americas in 1492, and Vasco da Gama's circumnavigation of India and Africa in 1498.

The numerous wars did not prevent European states from exploring and conquering wide portions of the world, from Africa to Asia and the newly discovered Americas. In the 15th century, Portugal led the way in geographical exploration along the coast of Africa in search of a maritime route to India, followed by Spain near the close of the 15th century, dividing their exploration of the world according to the Treaty of Tordesillas in 1494. They were the first states to set up colonies in America and European trading posts (factories) along the shores of Africa and Asia, establishing the first direct European diplomatic contacts with Southeast Asian states in 1511, China in 1513 and Japan in 1542. In 1552, Russian tsar Ivan the Terrible conquered two major Tatar khanates, the Khanate of Kazan and the Astrakhan Khanate. The Yermak's voyage of 1580 led to the annexation of the Tatar Siberian Khanate into Russia, and the Russians would soon after conquer the rest of Siberia, steadily expanding to the east and south over the next centuries. Oceanic explorations soon followed by France, England and the Netherlands, who explored the Portuguese and Spanish trade routes into the Pacific Ocean, reaching Australia in 1606 and New Zealand in 1642.

Reformation

With the development of the printing press, new ideas spread throughout Europe and challenged traditional doctrines in science and theology. Simultaneously, the Protestant Reformation under German Martin Luther questioned Papal authority. The most common dating of the Reformation begins in 1517, when Luther published The Ninety-Five Theses, and concludes in 1648 with the Treaty of Westphalia that ended years of European religious wars.

During this period corruption in the Catholic Church led to a sharp backlash in the Protestant Reformation. It gained many followers especially among princes and kings seeking a stronger state by ending the influence of the Catholic Church. Figures other than Martin Luther began to emerge as well like John Calvin whose Calvinism had influence in many countries and King Henry VIII of England who broke away from the Catholic Church in England and set up the Anglican Church; his daughter Queen Elizabeth finished the organization of the church. These religious divisions brought on a wave of wars inspired and driven by religion but also by the ambitious monarchs in Western Europe who were becoming more centralized and powerful.

The Protestant Reformation also led to a strong reform movement in the Catholic Church called the Counter-Reformation, which aimed to reduce corruption as well as to improve and strengthen Catholic dogma. Two important groups in the Catholic Church who emerged from this movement were the Jesuits, who helped keep Spain, Portugal, Poland, and other European countries within the Catholic fold, and the Oratorians of Saint Philip Neri, who ministered to the faithful in Rome, restoring their confidence in the Church of Jesus Christ that subsisted substantially in the Church of Rome. Still, the Catholic Church was somewhat weakened by the Reformation, portions of Europe were no longer under its sway and kings in the remaining Catholic countries began to take control of the church institutions within their kingdoms.

Unlike many European countries, the Polish–Lithuanian Commonwealth and Hungary were more tolerant. While still enforcing the predominance of Catholicism, they continued to allow the large religious minorities to maintain their faiths, traditions and customs. The Polish–Lithuanian Commonwealth became divided among Catholics, Protestants, Orthodox, Jews and a small Muslim population.

Another development was the idea of 'European superiority'. The ideal of civilization was taken over from the ancient Greeks and Romans: Discipline, education and living in the city were required to make people civilized; Europeans and non-Europeans were judged for their civility, and Europe regarded itself as superior to other continents. There was a movement by some such as Montaigne that regarded the non-Europeans as a better, more natural and primitive people. Post services were founded all over Europe, which allowed a humanistic interconnected network of intellectuals across Europe, despite religious divisions. However, the Roman Catholic Church banned many leading scientific works; this led to an intellectual advantage for Protestant countries, where the banning of books was regionally organised. Francis Bacon and other advocates of science tried to create unity in Europe by focusing on the unity in nature.1 In the 15th century, at the end of the Middle Ages, powerful sovereign states were appearing, built by the New Monarchs who were centralising power in France, England, and Spain. On the other hand, the Parliament in the Polish–Lithuanian Commonwealth grew in power, taking legislative rights from the Polish king. The new state power was contested by parliaments in other countries especially England. New kinds of states emerged which were co-operation agreements among territorial rulers, cities, farmer republics and knights.

Mercantilism and colonial expansion

The Iberian kingdoms were able to dominate colonial activity in the 16th century. The Portuguese forged the first global empire in the 15th and 16th century, whilst during the 16th century and the first half of the 17th century, the crown of Castile (and the overarching Hispanic Monarchy, including Portugal from 1580 to 1640) became the most powerful empire in the world. Spanish dominance in America was increasingly challenged by British, French, Dutch and Swedish colonial efforts of the 17th and 18th centuries. New forms of trade and expanding horizons made new forms of government, law and economics necessary.

Colonial expansion continued in the following centuries (with some setbacks, such as successful wars of independence in the British American colonies and then later Haiti, Mexico, Argentina, Brazil, and others amid European turmoil of the Napoleonic Wars). Spain had control of a large part of North America, all of Central America and a great part of South America, the Caribbean and the Philippines; Britain took the whole of Australia and New Zealand, most of India, and large parts of Africa and North America; France held parts of Canada and India (nearly all of which was lost to Britain in 1763), Indochina, large parts of Africa and the Caribbean islands; the Netherlands gained the East Indies (now Indonesia) and islands in the Caribbean; Portugal obtained Brazil and several territories in Africa and Asia; and later, powers such as Germany, Belgium, Italy and Russia acquired further colonies.

This expansion helped the economy of the countries owning them. Trade flourished, because of the minor stability of the empires. By the late 16th century, American silver accounted for one-fifth of Spain's total budget. The French colony of Saint-Domingue was one of richest European colonies in the 18th century, operating on a plantation economy fueled by slave labor. During the period of French rule, cash crops produced in Saint-Domingue comprised thirty percent of total French trade while its sugar exports represented forty percent of the Atlantic market.

Crisis of the 17th century

The 17th century was an era of crisis. Many historians have rejected the idea, while others promote it as an invaluable insight into the warfare, politics, economics, and even art. The Thirty Years' War (1618–1648) focused attention on the massive horrors that wars could bring to entire populations. The 1640s in particular saw more state breakdowns around the world than any previous or subsequent period. The Polish–Lithuanian Commonwealth, the largest state in Europe, temporarily disappeared. In addition, there were secessions and upheavals in several parts of the Spanish empire, the world's first global empire. In Britain the entire Stuart monarchy (England, Scotland, Ireland, and its North American colonies) rebelled. Political insurgency and a spate of popular revolts seldom equalled shook the foundations of most states in Europe and Asia. More wars took place around the world in the mid-17th century than in almost any other period of recorded history. The crises spread far beyond Europe – for example Ming China, the most populous state in the world, collapsed. Across the Northern Hemisphere, the mid-17th century experienced almost unprecedented death rates. Geoffrey Parker, a British historian, suggests that environmental factors may have been in part to blame, especially global cooling.

Age of absolutism

The "absolute" rule of powerful monarchs such as Louis XIV (ruled France 1643–1715), Peter the Great (ruled Russia 1682–1725), Maria Theresa (ruled Habsburg lands 1740–1780) and Frederick the Great (ruled Prussia 1740–86), produced powerful centralized states, with strong armies and powerful bureaucracies, all under the control of the king.

Throughout the early part of this period, capitalism (through mercantilism) was replacing feudalism as the principal form of economic organisation, at least in the western half of Europe. The expanding colonial frontiers resulted in a Commercial Revolution. The period is noted for the rise of modern science and the application of its findings to technological improvements, which animated the Industrial Revolution after 1750.

The Reformation had profound effects on the unity of Europe. Not only were nations divided one from another by their religious orientation, but some states were torn apart internally by religious strife, avidly fostered by their external enemies. France suffered this fate in the 16th century in the series of conflicts known as the French Wars of Religion, which ended in the triumph of the Bourbon Dynasty. England avoided this fate for a while and settled down under Elizabeth I to a moderate Anglicanism. Much of modern-day Germany was made up of numerous small sovereign states under the theoretical framework of the Holy Roman Empire, which was further divided along internally drawn sectarian lines. The Polish–Lithuanian Commonwealth is notable in this time for its religious indifference and a general immunity to the horrors of European religious strife.

Thirty Years' War 1618–1648

The Thirty Years' War was fought between 1618 and 1648, across Germany and neighbouring areas, and involved most of the major European powers except England and Russia. Beginning as a religious conflict between Protestants and Catholics in Bohemia, it quickly developed into a general war involving Catholics versus Protestants for the most part. The major impact of the war, in which mercenary armies were extensively used, was the devastation of entire regions scavenged bare by the foraging armies. Episodes of widespread famine and disease, and the breakup of family life, devastated the population of the German states and, to a lesser extent, the Low Countries, the Crown of Bohemia and northern parts of Italy, while bankrupting many of the regional powers involved. Between one-fourth and one-third of the German population perished from direct military causes or from disease and starvation, as well as postponed births.

After the Peace of Westphalia, which ended the war in favour of nations deciding their own religious allegiance, absolutism became the norm of the continent, while parts of Europe experimented with constitutions foreshadowed by the English Civil War and particularly the Glorious Revolution. European military conflict did not cease, but had less disruptive effects on the lives of Europeans. In the advanced northwest, the Enlightenment gave a philosophical underpinning to the new outlook, and the continued spread of literacy, made possible by the printing press, created new secular forces in thought.

From the Union of Krewo (see above) central and eastern Europe was dominated by Kingdom of Poland and Grand Duchy of Lithuania. In the 16th and 17th centuries Central and Eastern Europe was an arena of conflict for domination of the continent between Sweden, the Polish–Lithuanian Commonwealth (involved in series of wars, like Khmelnytsky uprising, Russo-Polish War, the Deluge, etc.) and the Ottoman Empire. This period saw a gradual decline of these three powers which were eventually replaced by new enlightened absolutist monarchies: Russia, Prussia and Austria (the Habsburg monarchy). By the turn of the 19th century they had become new powers, having divided Poland between themselves, with Sweden and Turkey having experienced substantial territorial losses to Russia and Austria respectively as well as pauperisation.

War of the Spanish Succession

The War of the Spanish Succession (1701–1715) was a major war with France opposed by a coalition of England, the Netherlands, the Habsburg monarchy, and Prussia. Duke of Marlborough commanded the English and Dutch victory at the Battle of Blenheim in 1704. The main issue was whether France under King Louis XIV would take control of Spain's very extensive possessions and thereby become by far the dominant power, or be forced to share power with other major nations. After initial allied successes, the long war produced a military stalemate and ended with the Treaty of Utrecht, which was based on a balance of power in Europe. Historian Russell Weigley argues that the many wars almost never accomplished more than they cost. British historian G. M. Trevelyan argues:
That Treaty [of Utrecht], which ushered in the stable and characteristic period of Eighteenth-Century civilization, marked the end of danger to Europe from the old French monarchy, and it marked a change of no less significance to the world at large – the maritime, commercial and financial supremacy of Great Britain.

Prussia

Frederick the Great, king of Prussia 1740–86, modernized the Prussian army, introduced new tactical and strategic concepts, fought mostly successful wars (Silesian Wars, Seven Years' War) and doubled the size of Prussia. Frederick had a rationale based on Enlightenment thought: he fought total wars for limited objectives. The goal was to convince rival kings that it was better to negotiate and make peace than to fight him.

Russia

Russia fought numerous wars to achieve rapid expansion toward the east – i.e. Siberia, Far East, south, to the Black Sea, and south-east and to central Asia. Russia boasted a large and powerful army, a very large and complex internal bureaucracy, and a splendid court that rivaled Paris and London. However the government was living far beyond its means and seized Church lands, leaving organized religion in a weak condition. Throughout the 18th century Russia remained "a poor, backward, overwhelmingly agricultural, and illiterate country."

Enlightenment

The Enlightenment was a powerful, widespread cultural movement of intellectuals beginning in late 17th-century Europe emphasizing the power of reason rather than tradition; it was especially favourable to science (especially Isaac Newton's physics) and hostile to religious orthodoxy (especially of the Catholic Church). It sought to analyze and reform society using reason, to challenge ideas grounded in tradition and faith, and to advance knowledge through the scientific method. It promoted scientific thought, skepticism, and intellectual interchange. The Enlightenment was a revolution in human thought. This new way of thinking was that rational thought begins with clearly stated principles, uses correct logic to arrive at conclusions, tests the conclusions against evidence, and then revises the principles in light of the evidence.

Enlightenment thinkers opposed superstition. Some Enlightenment thinkers collaborated with Enlightened despots, absolutist rulers who attempted to forcibly impose some of the new ideas about government into practice. The ideas of the Enlightenment exerted significant influence on the culture, politics, and governments of Europe.

Originating in the 17th century, it was sparked by philosophers Francis Bacon (1562–1626), Baruch Spinoza (1632–1677), John Locke (1632–1704), Pierre Bayle (1647–1706), Voltaire (1694–1778), Francis Hutcheson (1694–1746), David Hume (1711–1776) and physicist Isaac Newton (1643–1727). Ruling princes often endorsed and fostered these figures and even attempted to apply their ideas of government in what was known as enlightened absolutism. The Scientific Revolution is closely tied to the Enlightenment, as its discoveries overturned many traditional concepts and introduced new perspectives on nature and man's place within it. The Enlightenment flourished until about 1790–1800, at which point the Enlightenment, with its emphasis on reason, gave way to Romanticism, which placed a new emphasis on emotion; a Counter-Enlightenment began to increase in prominence. The Romantics argued that the Enlightenment was reductionistic insofar as it had largely ignored the forces of imagination, mystery, and sentiment.

In France, Enlightenment was based in the salons and culminated in the great Encyclopédie (1751–72) edited by Denis Diderot (1713–1784) and (until 1759) Jean le Rond d'Alembert (1717–1783) with contributions by hundreds of leading intellectuals who were called philosophes, notably Voltaire (1694–1778), Rousseau (1712–1778) and Montesquieu (1689–1755). Some 25,000 copies of the 35 volume encyclopedia were sold, half of them outside France. These new intellectual strains would spread to urban centres across Europe, notably England, Scotland, the German states, the Netherlands, Poland, Russia, Italy, Austria, and Spain, as well as Britain's American colonies.

The political ideals of the Enlightenment influenced the American Declaration of Independence, the United States Bill of Rights, the French Declaration of the Rights of Man and of the Citizen, and the Polish–Lithuanian Constitution of 3 May 1791.

Taking a long-term historical perspective, Norman Davies has argued that Freemasonry was a powerful force on behalf of Liberalism and Enlightenment ideas in Europe, from about 1700 to the 20th century. It expanded rapidly during the Age of Enlightenment, reaching practically every country in Europe. Prominent members included Montesquieu, Voltaire, Sir Robert Walpole, Wolfgang Amadeus Mozart, Johann Wolfgang von Goethe, Benjamin Franklin, and George Washington. Steven C. Bullock notes that in the late 18th century, English lodges were headed by the Prince of Wales, Prussian lodges by king Frederick the Great, and French lodges by royal princes. Emperor Napoleon selected as Grand Master of France his own brother.

The great enemy of Freemasonry was the Roman Catholic Church, so that in countries with a large Catholic element, such as France, Italy, Austria, Spain and Mexico, much of the ferocity of the political battles involve the confrontation between supporters of the Church versus active Masons. 20th-century totalitarian and revolutionary movements, especially the Fascists and Communists, crushed the Freemasons.

From revolution to imperialism (1789–1914)

The "long 19th century", from 1789 to 1914 saw the drastic social, political and economic changes initiated by the Industrial Revolution, the French Revolution and the Napoleonic Wars. Following the reorganisation of the political map of Europe at the Congress of Vienna in 1815, Europe experienced the rise of Nationalism, the rise of the Russian Empire and the peak of the British Empire, as well as the decline of the Ottoman Empire. Finally, the rise of the German Empire and the Austro-Hungarian Empire initiated the course of events that culminated in the outbreak of the First World War in 1914.

Industrial Revolution

The Industrial Revolution was a period in the late 18th century and early 19th century when major changes in agriculture, manufacturing, and transport impacted Britain and subsequently spread to the United States and Western Europe, a process that continues as industrialisation. Technological advancements, most notably the utilization of the steam engine, were major catalysts in the industrialisation process. It started in England and Scotland in the mid-18th century with the mechanisation of the textile industries, the development of iron-making techniques and the increased use of coal as the main fuel. Trade expansion was enabled by the introduction of canals, improved roads and railways. The introduction of steam power (fuelled primarily by coal) and powered machinery (mainly in textile manufacturing) underpinned the dramatic increases in production capacity. The development of all-metal machine tools in the first two decades of the 19th century facilitated the manufacture of more production machines for manufacturing in other industries. The effects spread throughout Western Europe and North America during the 19th century, eventually affecting most of the world. The impact of this change on society was enormous.

Era of the French Revolution

Historians R.R. Palmer and Joel Colton argue:
In 1789 France fell into revolution, and the world has never since been the same. The French Revolution was by far the most momentous upheaval of the whole revolutionary age. It replaced the "old regime" with "modern society," and at its extreme phase became very radical, so much so that all later revolutionary movements have looked back to it as a predecessor to themselves.... From the 1760s to 1848, the role of France was decisive.

The era of the French Revolution and the subsequent Napoleonic wars was a difficult time for monarchs. Tsar Paul I of Russia was assassinated; King Louis XVI of France was executed, as was his queen Marie Antoinette. Furthermore, kings Charles IV of Spain, Ferdinand VII of Spain and Gustav IV Adolf of Sweden were deposed as were ultimately the Emperor Napoleon and all of the relatives he had installed on various European thrones. King Frederick William III of Prussia and Emperor Francis II of Austria barely clung to their thrones. King George III of Great Britain lost the better part of the First British Empire.

The American Revolution (1775–1783) was the first successful revolt of a colony against a European power. It proclaimed, in the words of Thomas Jefferson, that "all men are created equal," a position based on the principles of the Enlightenment. It rejected aristocracy and established a republican form of government under George Washington that attracted worldwide attention.

The French Revolution (1789–1804) was a product of the same democratic forces in the Atlantic World and had an even greater impact. French historian François Aulard says:
From the social point of view, the Revolution consisted in the suppression of what was called the feudal system, in the emancipation of the individual, in greater division of landed property, the abolition of the privileges of noble birth, the establishment of equality, the simplification of life.... The French Revolution differed from other revolutions in being not merely national, for it aimed at benefiting all humanity."

French intervention in the American Revolutionary War had nearly bankrupted the state. After repeated failed attempts at financial reform, King Louis XVI had to convene the Estates-General, a representative body of the country made up of three estates: the clergy, the nobility, and the commoners. The third estate, joined by members of the other two, declared itself to be a National Assembly and swore an oath not to dissolve until France had a constitution and created, in July, the National Constituent Assembly. At the same time the people of Paris revolted, famously storming the Bastille prison on 14 July 1789.

At the time the assembly wanted to create a constitutional monarchy, and over the following two years passed various laws including the Declaration of the Rights of Man and of the Citizen, the abolition of feudalism, and a fundamental change in the relationship between France and Rome. At first the king agreed with these changes and enjoyed reasonable popularity with the people. As anti-royalism increased along with threat of foreign invasion, the king tried to flee and join France's enemies. He was captured and on 21 January 1793, having been convicted of treason, he was guillotined.

On 20 September 1792 the National Convention abolished the monarchy and declared France a republic. Due to the emergency of war, the National Convention created the Committee of Public Safety, controlled by Maximilien de Robespierre of the Jacobin Club, to act as the country's executive. Under Robespierre, the committee initiated the Reign of Terror, during which up to 40,000 people were executed in Paris, mainly nobles and those convicted by the Revolutionary Tribunal, often on the flimsiest of evidence. Internal tensions at Paris drove the Committee towards increasing assertions of radicalism and increasing suspicions, fueling new terror: A few months into this phase, more and more prominent revolutionaries were being sent to the guillotine by Robespierre and his faction, for example Madame Roland and Georges Danton. Elsewhere in the country, counter-revolutionary insurrections were brutally suppressed. The regime was overthrown in the coup of 9 Thermidor (27 July 1794) and Robespierre was executed. The regime which followed ended the Terror and relaxed Robespierre's more extreme policies.

Napoleon

Napoleon Bonaparte was one of the world's most famous soldiers and statesmen, leading France to great victories over numerous European enemies. Despite modest origins he became Emperor and restructured much of European diplomacy, politics and law, until he was forced to abdicate in 1814. His 100-day comeback in 1815 failed at the Battle of Waterloo, and he died in exile on a remote island, remembered as a great hero by many Frenchmen and as a great villain by British and other enemies.

Napoleon, despite his youth, was France's most successful general in the Revolutionary wars, having conquered large parts of Italy and forced the Austrians to sue for peace. In 1799 on 18 Brumaire (9 November) he overthrew the feeble government, replacing it with the Consulate, which he dominated. He gained popularity in France by restoring the Church, keeping taxes low, centralizing power in Paris, and winning glory on the battlefield. In 1804 he crowned himself Emperor. In 1805, Napoleon planned to invade Britain, but a renewed British alliance with Russia and Austria (Third Coalition), forced him to turn his attention towards the continent, while at the same time the French fleet was demolished by the British at the Battle of Trafalgar, ending any plan to invade Britain. On 2 December 1805, Napoleon defeated a numerically superior Austro-Russian army at Austerlitz, forcing Austria's withdrawal from the coalition (see Treaty of Pressburg) and dissolving the Holy Roman Empire. In 1806, a Fourth Coalition was set up. On 14 October Napoleon defeated the Prussians at the Battle of Jena-Auerstedt, marched through Germany and defeated the Russians on 14 June 1807 at Friedland. The Treaties of Tilsit divided Europe between France and Russia and created the Duchy of Warsaw.

On 12 June 1812 Napoleon invaded Russia with a Grande Armée of nearly 700,000 troops. After the measured victories at Smolensk and Borodino Napoleon occupied Moscow, only to find it burned by the retreating Russian army. He was forced to withdraw. On the march back his army was harassed by Cossacks, and suffered disease and starvation. Only 20,000 of his men survived the campaign. By 1813 the tide had begun to turn from Napoleon. Having been defeated by a seven nation army at the Battle of Leipzig in October 1813, he was forced to abdicate after the Six Days' Campaign and the occupation of Paris. Under the Treaty of Fontainebleau he was exiled to the island of Elba. He returned to France on 1 March 1815 (see Hundred Days), raised an army, but was finally defeated by a British and Prussian force at the Battle of Waterloo on 18 June 1815 and exiled to the small British island of Saint Helena in the South Atlantic.

Impact of the French Revolution

Roberts finds that the Revolutionary and Napoleonic wars, from 1793 to 1815, caused 4 million deaths (of whom 1 million were civilians); 1.4 million were French deaths.

Outside France the Revolution had a major impact. Its ideas became widespread. Roberts argues that Napoleon was responsible for key ideas of the modern world, so that, "meritocracy, equality before the law, property rights, religious toleration, modern secular education, sound finances, and so on-were protected, consolidated, codified, and geographically extended by Napoleon during his 16 years of power."

Furthermore, the French armies in the 1790s and 1800s directly overthrew feudal remains in much of western Europe. They liberalised property laws, ended seigneurial dues, abolished the guild of merchants and craftsmen to facilitate entrepreneurship, legalised divorce, closed the Jewish ghettos and made Jews equal to everyone else. The Inquisition ended as did the Holy Roman Empire. The power of church courts and religious authority was sharply reduced and equality under the law was proclaimed for all men.

In foreign affairs, the French Army down to 1812 was quite successful. Roberts says that Napoleon fought 60 battles, losing only seven. France conquered Belgium and turned it into another province of France. It conquered the Netherlands, and made it a client state. It took control of the German areas on the left bank of the Rhine River and set up a puppet Confederation of the Rhine. It conquered Switzerland and most of Italy, setting up a series of puppet states. The result was glory for France, and an infusion of much needed money from the conquered lands, which also provided direct support to the French Army. However the enemies of France, led by Britain and funded by the inexhaustible British Treasury, formed a Second Coalition in 1799 (with Britain joined by Russia, the Ottoman Empire and Austria). It scored a series of victories that rolled back French successes, and trapped the French Army in Egypt. Napoleon himself slipped through the British blockade in October 1799, returning to Paris, where he overthrew the government and made himself the ruler.

Napoleon conquered most of Italy in the name of the French Revolution in 1797–99. He consolidated old units and split up Austria's holdings. He set up a series of new republics, complete with new codes of law and abolition of old feudal privileges. Napoleon's Cisalpine Republic was centered on Milan; Genoa became a republic; the Roman Republic was formed as well as the small Ligurian Republic around Genoa. The Neapolitan Republic was formed around Naples, but it lasted only five months. He later formed the Kingdom of Italy, with his brother as King. In addition, France turned the Netherlands into the Batavian Republic, and Switzerland into the Helvetic Republic. All these new countries were satellites of France, and had to pay large subsidies to Paris, as well as provide military support for Napoleon's wars. Their political and administrative systems were modernized, the metric system introduced, and trade barriers reduced. Jewish ghettos were abolished. Belgium and Piedmont became integral parts of France.

Most of the new nations were abolished and returned to prewar owners in 1814. However, Artz emphasizes the benefits the Italians gained from the French Revolution:
For nearly two decades the Italians had excellent codes of law, a fair system of taxation, a better economic situation, and more religious and intellectual toleration than they had known for centuries.... Everywhere old physical, economic, and intellectual barriers had been thrown down and the Italians had begun to be aware of a common nationality.

Likewise in Switzerland the long-term impact of the French Revolution has been assessed by Martin:
It proclaimed the equality of citizens before the law, equality of languages, freedom of thought and faith; it created a Swiss citizenship, basis of our modern nationality, and the separation of powers, of which the old regime had no conception; it suppressed internal tariffs and other economic restraints; it unified weights and measures, reformed civil and penal law, authorized mixed marriages (between Catholics and Protestants), suppressed torture and improved justice; it developed education and public works.

The greatest impact came of course in France itself. In addition to effects similar to those in Italy and Switzerland, France saw the introduction of the principle of legal equality, and the downgrading of the once powerful and rich Catholic Church to just a bureau controlled by the government. Power became centralized in Paris, with its strong bureaucracy and an army supplied by conscripting all young men. French politics were permanently polarized – new names were given, "left" and "right" for the supporters and opponents of the principles of the Revolution.

British historian Max Hastings says there is no question that as a military genius Napoleon ranks with Alexander the Great and Julius Caesar in greatness. However, in the political realm, historians debate whether Napoleon was "an enlightened despot who laid the foundations of modern Europe or, instead, a megalomaniac who wrought greater misery than any man before the coming of Hitler".

Religion

By the 19th century, governments increasingly took over traditional religious roles, paying much more attention to efficiency and uniformity than to religiosity. Secular bodies took control of education away from the churches, abolished taxes and tithes for the support of established religions, and excluded bishops from the upper houses. Secular laws increasingly regulated marriage and divorce, and maintaining birth and death registers became the duty of local officials. Although the numerous religious denominations in the United States founded many colleges and universities, that was almost exclusively a state function across Europe. Imperial powers protected Christian missionaries in African and Asian colonies. In France and other largely Catholic nations, anti-clerical political movements tried to reduce the role of the Catholic Church. Likewise briefly in Germany in the 1870s there was a fierce Kulturkampf (culture war) against Catholics, but the Catholics successfully fought back. The Catholic Church concentrated more power in the papacy and fought against secularism and socialism. It sponsored devotional reforms that gained wide support among the churchgoers.

Protestantism
Historian Kenneth Scott Latourette argues that the outlook for Protestantism at the start of the 19th century was discouraging. It was a regional religion based in Northwestern Europe, with an outpost in the sparsely settled United States. It was closely allied with government, as in Scandinavia, the Netherlands, Prussia, and especially Great Britain. The alliance came at the expense of independence, as the government made the basic policy decisions, down to such details as the salaries of ministers and location of new churches. The dominant intellectual currents of the Enlightenment promoted rationalism, and most Protestant leaders preached a sort of deism. Intellectually, the new methods of historical and anthropological study undermine automatic acceptance of biblical stories, as did the sciences of geology and biology. Industrialization was a strongly negative factor, as workers who moved to the city seldom joined churches. The gap between the church and the unchurched grew rapidly, and secular forces, based both in socialism and liberalism undermine the prestige of religion. Despite the negative forces, Protestantism demonstrated a striking vitality by 1900. Shrugging off Enlightenment rationalism, Protestants embraced romanticism, with the stress on the personal and the invisible. Entirely fresh ideas as expressed by Friedrich Schleiermacher, Soren Kierkegaard, Albrecht Ritschl and Adolf von Harnack restored the intellectual power of theology. There was more attention to historic creeds such as the Augsburg, the Heidelberg, and the Westminster confessions. In England, Anglicans emphasize the historically Catholic components of their heritage, as the High Church element reintroduced vestments and incense into their rituals. The stirrings of pietism on the Continent, and evangelicalism in Britain expanded enormously, leading the devout away from an emphasis on formality and ritual and toward an inner sensibility toward personal relationship to Christ. Social activities, in education and in opposition to social vices such as slavery, alcoholism and poverty provided new opportunities for social service. Above all, worldwide missionary activity became a highly prized goal, proving quite successful in close cooperation with European colonialists, particularly during the New Imperialism period.

Nations rising

Emerging nationalism

The political development of nationalism and the push for popular sovereignty culminated with the ethnic/national revolutions of Europe. During the 19th century nationalism became one of the most significant political and social forces in history; it is typically listed among the top causes of World War I.

Napoleon's conquests of the German and Italian states around 1800–1806 played a major role in stimulating nationalism and the demands for national unity.

Germany 

In the German states east of Prussia Napoleon abolished many of the old or medieval relics, such as dissolving the Holy Roman Empire in 1806. He imposed rational legal systems and demonstrated how dramatic changes were possible. For example, his organization of the Confederation of the Rhine in 1806 promoted a feeling of German nationalism. Nationalists sought to encompass masculinity in their quest for strength and unity. In the 1860s it was Prussian chancellor Otto von Bismarck who achieved German unification in 1870 after the many smaller states followed Prussia's leadership in wars against Denmark, Austria and France.

Italy 

Italian nationalism emerged in the 19th century and was the driving force for Italian unification or the "Risorgimento" (meaning the Resurgence or revival). It was the political and intellectual movement that consolidated different states of the Italian Peninsula into the single state of the Kingdom of Italy in 1860. The memory of the Risorgimento is central to both Italian nationalism and Italian historiography.

Serbia 

For centuries the Orthodox Christian Serbs were ruled by the Muslim-controlled Ottoman Empire. The success of the Serbian revolution (1804–1817) against Ottoman rule in 1817 marked the foundation of modern Principality of Serbia. It achieved de facto independence in 1867 and finally gained recognition by the Great Powers in the Berlin Congress of 1878. The Serbs developed a larger vision for nationalism in Pan-Slavism and with Russian support sought to pull the other Slavs out of the Austro-Hungarian Empire. Austria, with German backing, tried to crush Serbia in 1914 but Russia intervened, thus igniting the First World War in which Austria dissolved into nation states.

In 1918, the region of Vojvodina proclaimed its secession from Austria-Hungary to unite with the pan-Slavic State of Slovenes, Croats and Serbs; the Kingdom of Serbia joined the union on 1 December 1918, and the country was named Kingdom of Serbs, Croats, and Slovenes. It was renamed Yugoslavia, which was never able to tame the multiple nationalities and religions and it flew apart in civil war in the 1990s.

Greece 

The Greek drive for independence from the Ottoman Empire inspired supporters across Christian Europe, especially in Britain. France, Russia and Britain intervened to make this nationalist dream become reality with the Greek War of Independence (1821-1829/1830).

Bulgaria 

Bulgarian modern nationalism emerged under Ottoman rule in the late 18th and early 19th century, under the influence of western ideas such as liberalism and nationalism, which trickled into the country after the French revolution, mostly via Greece, although there were stirrings in the 18th century. Russia, as a World Great Power of fellow Orthodox Slavs, could appeal to the Bulgarians in a way that Austria could not. An autonomous Bulgarian Exarchate was established in 1870/1872 for the diocese of Bulgaria as well as for those, wherein at least two-thirds of Orthodox Christians were willing to join it. The April Uprising in 1876 indirectly resulted in the re-establishment of Bulgaria in 1878.

Poland 

The cause of Polish nationalism was repeatedly frustrated before 1918. In the 1790s, Germany, Russia and Austria partitioned Poland. Napoleon set up the Duchy of Warsaw, a new Polish state that ignited a spirit of nationalism. Russia took it over in 1815 as Congress Poland with the tsar as King of Poland. Large-scale nationalist revolts erupted in 1830 and 1863–64 but were harshly crushed by Russia, which tried to Russify the Polish language, culture and religion. The collapse of the Russian Empire in the First World War enabled the major powers to reestablish an independent Second Polish Republic, which survived until 1939. Meanwhile, Poles in areas controlled by Germany moved into heavy industry but their religion came under attack by Bismarck in the Kulturkampf of the 1870s. The Poles joined German Catholics in a well-organized new Centre Party, and defeated Bismarck politically. He responded by stopping the harassment and cooperating with the Centre Party.

Spain 

After the War of the Spanish Succession, rooted in the political position of the Count-Duke of Olivares and the absolutism of Philip V, the assimilation of the Crown of Aragon by the Castilian Crown through the Decrees of Nova planta was the first step in the creation of the Spanish nation state. As in other contemporary European states, political union was the first step in the creation of the Spanish nation-state, in this case not on a uniform ethnic basis, but through the imposition of the political and cultural characteristics of the dominant ethnic group, in this case the Castilians, over those of other ethnic groups, who became national minorities to be assimilated. In fact, since the political unification of 1714, Spanish assimilation policies towards Catalan-speaking territories (Catalonia, Valencia, the Balearic Islands, part of Aragon) and other national minorities have been a historical constant. The nationalization process accelerated in the 19th century, in parallel to the origin of Spanish nationalism, the social, political and ideological movement that tried to shape a Spanish national identity based on the Castilian model, in conflict with the other historical nations of the State. These nationalist policies, sometimes very aggressive, and still in force, have been, and still are, the seed of repeated territorial conflicts within the State.

Education
An important component of nationalism was the study of the nation's heritage, emphasizing the national language and literary culture. This stimulated, and was in turn strongly supported by, the emergence of national educational systems reaching the general population. Latin gave way to the national language, and compulsory education, with strong support from modernizers and the media, became standard in Germany and eventually the other West European nations. Voting reforms extended the franchise to the previously excluded elements. A strong sentiment among the elites was the necessity for compulsory public education, so that the new electorate could understand and handle its duties. Every country developed a sense of national origins – the historical accuracy was less important than the motivation toward patriotism. Universal compulsory education was extended as well to girls, at least at the elementary level. By the 1890s, strong movements emerged in some countries, including France, Germany and the United States, to extend compulsory education to the secondary level.

Ideological coalitions

After the defeat of revolutionary France, the great powers tried to restore the situation which existed before 1789. In 1815 at the Congress of Vienna, the major powers of Europe managed to produce a peaceful balance of power among the various European empires. This was known as the Metternich system. The powerbase of their support was the aristocracy, with its great landed wealth and control of the government, the church, and the military in most countries. However, their reactionary efforts were unable to stop the spread of revolutionary movements: the middle classes had been deeply influenced by the ideals of the French revolution, and the Industrial Revolution brought important economical and social changes.

Radical intellectuals looked to the working classes for a base for socialist, communist and anarchistic ideas. Widely influential was the 1848 pamphlet by Karl Marx and Friedrich Engels The Communist Manifesto.

The middle classes and businessmen promoted liberalism, free trade and capitalism. Aristocratic elements concentrated in government service, the military and the established churches. Nationalist movements (in Germany, Italy, Poland, Hungary, and elsewhere) called upon the "racial" unity (which usually meant a common language and an imagined common ethnicity) to seek national unification and/or liberation from foreign rule. As a result, the period between 1815 and 1871 saw a large number of revolutionary attempts and independence wars. Greece successfully revolted against Ottoman rule in the 1820s. European diplomats and intellectuals saw the Greek struggle for independence, with its accounts of Turkish atrocities, in a romantic light.

France under Napoleon III

Napoleon III, nephew of Napoleon I, parlayed his famous name and to widespread popularity across France. He returned from exile in 1848, promising to stabilize the chaotic political situation. He was elected president and maneuvered successfully to name himself Emperor, a move approved later by a large majority of the French electorate. The first part of his Imperial term brought many important reforms, facilitated by Napoleon's control of the lawmaking body, the government, and the French Armed Forces. Hundreds of old Republican leaders were arrested and deported. Napoleon controlled the media and censored the news. In compensation for the loss of freedom, Napoleon gave the people new hospitals and asylums, beautified and modernized Paris, and built a modern railroad and transportation system that dramatically improved commerce, and helped the many small farmers as well. The economy grew, but industrialization was not as rapid as Britain, and France depended largely on small family-oriented firms as opposed to the large companies that were emerging in the United States and Germany. France was on the winning side in the Crimean War (1854–56), but after 1858 Napoleon's foreign-policy was less and less successful. He antagonized Great Britain and failed to appreciate the danger of war with Prussia. Foreign-policy blunders finally destroyed his reign in 1870–71. He gained worldwide attention for his aggressive foreign policy in Europe, Mexico, and worldwide. He helped in the unification of Italy by fighting the Austrian Empire and joined the Crimean War on the side of the United Kingdom to defend the Ottoman Empire against Russia. His empire collapsed after being defeated in the Franco-Prussian War.

France became a republic, but until the 1880s there was a strong popular demand for return to monarchy. That never happened because of the blunders made by the available monarchs. Hostility to the Catholic Church became a major issue, as France battle between secular and religious forces well into the 20th century, with the secular elements usually more successful. The French Third Republic emerged in 1871, was on the winning side of the first world war, and was finally overthrown when it was defeated in 1940 in World War II.

Major powers

Most European states had become constitutional (rather than absolute) monarchies by 1871, and Germany and Italy merged many small city-states to become united nation-states. Germany in particular increasingly dominated the continent in terms of economics and political power. Meanwhile, on a global scale, Great Britain, with its far-flung British Empire, unmatched Royal Navy, and powerful bankers, became the world's first global power. The sun never set on its territories, while an informal empire operated through British financiers, entrepreneurs, traders and engineers who established operations in many countries, and largely dominated Latin America. The British were especially famous for financing and constructing railways around the world.

Bismarck's Germany

From his base in Prussia, Otto von Bismarck in the 1860s engineered a series of short, decisive wars, that unified most of the German states (excluding Austria) into a powerful German Empire under Prussian leadership. He humiliated France in the process, but kept on good terms with Austria-Hungary. With that accomplished by 1871 he then skillfully used balance of power diplomacy to preserve Germany's new role and keep Europe at peace. The new German Empire industrialized rapidly and challenged Britain for economic leadership. Bismarck disliked colonies but public and elite opinion forced him to build an overseas empire. He was removed from office in 1890 by an aggressive young Kaiser Wilhelm II, who pursued a disruptive foreign policy that polarized Europe into rival camps. These rival camps went to war with each other in 1914.

Austrian and Russian empires

The power of nationalism to create new states was irresistible in the 19th century, and the process could lead to collapse in the absence of a strong nationalism. Austria-Hungary had the advantage of size, but multiple disadvantages. There were rivals on four sides, its finances were unstable, the population was fragmented into multiple ethnicities and languages that served as the bases for separatist nationalisms. It had a large army with good forts, but its industrial base was thin. Its naval resources were so minimal that it did not attempt to build an overseas empire. It did have the advantage of good diplomats, typified by Metternich (Foreign Minister 1809–1848, Prime Minister, 1821–1848)). They employed a grand strategy for survival that balanced out different forces, set up buffer zones, and kept the Hapsburg empire going despite wars with the Ottomans, Frederick the Great, Napoleon and Bismarck, until the final disaster of the First World War. The Empire overnight disintegrated into multiple states based on ethnic nationalism and the principle of self-determination.

The Russian Empire likewise brought together a multitude of languages and cultures, so that its military defeat in the First World War led to multiple splits that created independent Finland, Latvia, Lithuania, Estonia, and Poland, and for a brief spell, independent Ukraine, Armenia, Georgia, and Azerbaijan.

Growth of European armies 1871 to 1904
Table: European armies on active duty in 1871, 1904

Imperialism

Colonial empires were the product of the European Age of Discovery from the 15th century. The initial impulse behind these dispersed maritime empires and those that followed was trade, driven by the new ideas and the capitalism that grew out of the Renaissance. Both the Portuguese Empire and Spanish Empire quickly grew into the first global political and economic systems with territories spread around the world.

Subsequent major European colonial empires included the French, Dutch, and British empires. The latter, consolidated during the period of British maritime hegemony in the 19th century, became the largest empire in history because of the improved ocean transportation technologies of the time as well as electronic communication through the telegraph, cable, and radio. At its height in 1920, the British Empire covered a quarter of the Earth's land area and comprised a quarter of its population. Other European countries, such as Belgium, Germany, and Italy, pursued colonial empires as well (mostly in Africa), but they were smaller. Ignoring the oceans, Russia built its Russian Empire through conquest by land in Eastern Europe, and Asia.

By the mid-19th century, the Ottoman Empire had declined enough to become a target for other global powers (see History of the Balkans). This instigated the Crimean War in 1854 and began a tenser period of minor clashes among the globe-spanning empires of Europe that eventually set the stage for the First World War. In the second half of the 19th century, the Kingdom of Sardinia and the Kingdom of Prussia carried out a series of wars that resulted in the creation of Italy and Germany as nation-states, significantly changing the balance of power in Europe. From 1870, Otto von Bismarck engineered a German hegemony of Europe that put France in a critical situation. It slowly rebuilt its relationships, seeking alliances with Russia and Britain to control the growing power of Germany. In this way, two opposing sides – the Triple Alliance of 1882 (Germany, Austria-Hungary and Italy) and the Triple Entente of 1907 (Britain, France and Russia) – formed in Europe, improving their military forces and alliances year-by-year.

1914–1945: two world wars

German-American historian Konrad Jarausch, asked if he agreed that "the European record of the past century [was] just one gigantic catastrophe", argues:
It is true that the first half of the 20th century was full of internecine warfare, economic depression, ethnic cleansing and racist genocide that killed tens of millions of people, more than any other period in human history. But looking only at the disasters creates an incomplete perception, because the second half of the century witnessed a much more positive development in spite of the Cold War. After the defeat of Fascism in 1945, the peaceful revolution of 1989/90 also liberated the East from Communist control in a quite unexpected fashion. As a result, Europeans generally live more free, prosperous and healthy lives than ever before.

The "short twentieth century", from 1914 to 1991, included the First World War, the Second World War and the Cold War. The First World War used modern technology to kill millions of soldiers. Victory by Britain, France, the United States and other allies drastically changed the map of Europe, ending four major land empires (the Russian, German, Austro-Hungarian and Ottoman empires) and leading to the creation of nation-states across Central and Eastern Europe. The October Revolution in Russia led to the creation of the Soviet Union (1917–1991) and the rise of the international communist movement. Widespread economic prosperity was typical of the period before 1914, and 1920–1929. After the onset of the Great Depression in 1929, however, democracy collapsed in most of Europe. Benito Mussolini's National Fascist Party took control in Italy, and the even more aggressive Nazi Party led by Adolf Hitler took control of Germany, 1933–45. The Second World War was fought on an even larger scale than the First war, killing many more people, and using even more advanced technology. It ended with the division of Europe between East and West, with the East under the control of the Soviet Union and the West dominated by NATO. The two sides engaged in the Cold War, with actual conflict taking place not in Europe but in Asia in the Korean War and the Vietnam War. The Imperial system collapsed. The remaining colonial empires ended through the decolonisation of European rule in Africa and Asia. The fall of Soviet Communism (1989–1991) left the West dominant and enabled the reunification of Germany. It accelerated the process of a European integration to include Eastern Europe. The European Union continues today, but with German economic dominance. Since the worldwide Great Recession of 2008, European growth has been slow, and financial crises have hit Greece and other countries. Modern-day Russia is weaker by military might, compared to when it was a superpower as a part of the Soviet Union, but has retained its historical status as both a great power and a regional power, confronting Ukraine and other post-Soviet states.

World War I

After the relative peace of most of the 19th century, the rivalry between European powers, compounded by a rising nationalism among ethnic groups, exploded in August 1914, when the First World War started. Over 65 million European soldiers were mobilised from 1914 to 1918; 20 million soldiers and civilians died, and 21 million were seriously wounded. On one side were Germany, Austria-Hungary, the Ottoman Empire and Bulgaria (the Central Powers/Triple Alliance), while on the other side stood Serbia and the Triple Entente – the coalition of France, Britain and Russia, which were joined by Italy in 1915, Romania in 1916 and by the United States in 1917. The Western Front involved especially brutal combat without any territorial gains by either side. Single battles like Verdun and the Somme killed hundreds of thousands of men while leaving the stalemate unchanged. Heavy artillery and machine guns caused most of the casualties, supplemented by poison gas. Czarist Russia collapsed in the February Revolution of 1917 and Germany claimed victory on the Eastern Front. After eight months of liberal rule, the October Revolution brought Vladimir Lenin and the Bolsheviks to power, leading to the creation of the Soviet Union in place of the disintegrated Russian Empire. With American entry into the war in 1917 on the Allied side, and the failure of Germany's spring 1918 offensive, Germany had run out of manpower, while an average of 10,000 American troops were arriving in France every day in the summer of 1918. Germany's allies, Austria-Hungary and the Ottoman Empire, surrendered and dissolved, followed by Germany on 11 November 1918. The victors forced Germany to assume responsibility for the conflict and pay war reparations.

One factor in determining the outcome of the war was that the Allies had significantly more economic resources they could spend on the war. One estimate (using 1913 US dollars) is that the Allies spent $58 billion on the war and the Central Powers only $25 billion. Among the Allies, Britain spent $21 billion and the U.S. $17 billion; among the Central Powers Germany spent $20 billion.

Paris Peace Conference

The world war was settled by the victors at the Paris Peace Conference in 1919. Two dozen nations sent delegations, and there were many nongovernmental groups, but the defeated powers were not invited.

The "Big Four" were President Woodrow Wilson of the United States, Prime Minister David Lloyd George of Great Britain, Georges Clemenceau of France, and, of least importance, Italian Prime Minister Vittorio Orlando. Each has a large staff of experts. They met together informally 145 times and made all the major decisions, which in turn were ratified by the others.

The major decisions were the creation of the League of Nations; the six peace treaties with defeated enemies, most notable the Treaty of Versailles with Germany; the awarding of German and Ottoman overseas possessions as "mandates", chiefly to Britain and France; and the drawing of new national boundaries (sometimes with plebiscites) to better reflect the forces of nationalism.

The Big Four implemented sweeping changes to the political geography of the world. Most famously, the Treaty of Versailles itself weakened Germany's military power and placed full blame for the war and costly reparations on its shoulders – the humiliation and resentment in Germany was probably one of the causes of Nazi success and indirectly a cause of World War II.

At the insistence of President Wilson, the Big Four required the Second Polish Republic to sign a treaty on 28 June 1919 that guaranteed minority rights in the new nation. Poland signed under protest, and made little effort to enforce the specified rights for Germans, Jews, Ukrainians, and other minorities. Similar treaties were signed by Czechoslovakia, Romania, Yugoslavia, Greece, Austria, Hungary, Bulgaria, and later by Latvia, Estonia and Lithuania. Finland and Germany were not asked to sign a minority rights treaty.

Interwar

In the Treaty of Versailles (1919) the winners recognised the new states (Poland, Czechoslovakia, Hungary, Austria, Yugoslavia, Finland, Estonia, Latvia, Lithuania) created in central Europe from the defunct German, Austro-Hungarian and Russian empires, based on national (ethnic) self-determination. It was a peaceful era with a few small wars before 1922 such as the Ukrainian–Soviet War (1917–1921) and the Polish–Soviet War (1919–1921). Prosperity was widespread, and the major cities sponsored a youth culture called the "Roaring Twenties" or "Jazz Age" that was often featured in the cinema, which attracted very large audiences.

The Allied victory in the First World War seemed to mark the triumph of liberalism, not just in the Allied countries themselves, but also in Germany and in the new states of Eastern Europe, as well as Japan. Authoritarian militarism as typified by Germany had been defeated and discredited. Historian Martin Blinkhorn argues that the liberal themes were ascendant in terms of "cultural pluralism, religious and ethnic toleration, national self-determination, free-market economics, representative and responsible government, free trade, unionism, and the peaceful settlement of international disputes through a new body, the League of Nations." However, as early as 1917, the emerging liberal order was being challenged by the new communist movement taking inspiration from the Russian Revolution. Communist revolts were beaten back everywhere else, but they did succeed in Russia.

Fascism and authoritarianism

Italy adopted an authoritarian dictatorship known as Fascism in 1922; it became a model for Hitler in Germany and for right wing elements in other countries. Historian Stanley G. Payne says Italian fascism was:
A primarily political dictatorship....The Fascist Party itself had become almost completely bureaucratized and subservient to, not dominant over, the state itself. Big business, industry, and finance retained extensive autonomy, particularly in the early years. The armed forces also enjoyed considerable autonomy....The Fascist militia was placed under military control....The judicial system was left largely intact and relatively autonomous as well. The police continued to be directed by state officials and were not taken over by party leaders...nor was a major new police elite created....There was never any question of bringing the Church under overall subservience.... Sizable sectors of Italian cultural life retained extensive autonomy, and no major state propaganda-and-culture ministry existed....The Mussolini regime was neither especially sanguinary nor particularly repressive.

Authoritarian regimes replaced democracy in the 1930s in Nazi Germany, Portugal, Austria, Poland, Greece, the Baltic countries and Francoist Spain. By 1940, there were only four liberal democracies left on the European continent: France, Finland, Switzerland and Sweden.

Great Depression: 1929–1939

After the Wall Street Crash of 1929, nearly the whole world sank into a Great Depression, as money stopped flowing from New York to Europe, prices fell, profits fell, and unemployment soared. The worst hit sectors included heavy industry, export-oriented agriculture, mining and lumbering, and construction. World trade fell by two-thirds.

Liberalism and democracy were discredited. In most of Europe, as well as in Japan and most of Latin America, nation after nation turned to dictators and authoritarian regimes. The most momentous change of government came when Hitler and his Nazis took power in Germany in 1933. The main institution that was meant to bring stability was the League of Nations, created in 1919. However the League failed to resolve any major crises and by 1938 it was no longer a major player. The League was undermined by the bellicosity of Nazi Germany, Imperial Japan, the Soviet Union, and Mussolini's Italy, and by the non-participation of the United States. By 1937 it was largely ignored.

A major civil war took place in Spain, with the nationalists winning. The League of Nations was helpless as Italy conquered Ethiopia and Japan seized Manchuria in 1931 and took over most of China starting in 1937.

The Spanish Civil War (1936–1939) was marked by numerous small battles and sieges, and many atrocities, until the rebels (the Nationalist faction), led by Francisco Franco, won in 1939. There was military intervention as Italy sent land forces, and Germany sent smaller elite air force and armoured units to the Nationalists. The Soviet Union sold armaments to the leftist Republican faction on the other side, while the Communist parties in numerous countries sent soldiers to the "International Brigades." The civil war did not escalate into a larger conflict, but did become a worldwide ideological battleground that pitted the left, the communist movement and many liberals against Catholics, conservatives, and fascists. Britain, France and the US remained neutral and refused to sell military supplies to either side. Worldwide there was a decline in pacifism and a growing sense that another world war was imminent, and that it would be worth fighting for.

World War II

In the Munich Agreement of 1938, Britain and France adopted a policy of appeasement as they gave Hitler what he wanted out of Czechoslovakia in the hope that it would bring peace. It did not. In 1939 Germany took over the rest of Czechoslovakia and appeasement policies gave way to hurried rearmament as Hitler next turned his attention to Poland.

After allying with Japan in the Anti-Comintern Pact and then also with Benito Mussolini's Italy in the "Pact of Steel", and finally signing a non-aggression treaty with the Soviet Union in August 1939, Hitler launched the Second World War on 1 September 1939 by attacking Poland. To his surprise Britain and France declared war on Germany, but there was little fighting during the "Phoney War" period. War began in earnest in spring 1940 with the successful Blitzkrieg conquests of Denmark, Norway, the Low Countries, and France. Britain remained alone but refused to negotiate, and defeated Germany's air attacks in the Battle of Britain. Hitler's goal was to control Eastern Europe but because of his failure to defeat Britain and the Italian failures in North Africa and the Balkans, the great attack on the Soviet Union was delayed until June 1941. Despite initial successes, the Wehrmacht was stopped close to Moscow in December 1941.

Over the next year the tide was turned and the Germans started to suffer a series of defeats, for example in the siege of Stalingrad and at Kursk. Meanwhile, Japan (allied to Germany and Italy since September 1940) attacked Britain and the United States on 7 December 1941; Germany then completed its over-extension by declaring war on the United States. War raged between the Axis Powers (Germany, Italy, and Japan) and the Allied Forces (British Empire, Soviet Union, and the United States). The Allied Forces won in North Africa, invaded Italy in 1943, and recaptured France in 1944. In the spring of 1945 Germany itself was invaded from the east by the Soviet Union and from the west by the other Allies. As the Red Army conquered the Reichstag in the Battle of Berlin, Hitler committed suicide and Germany surrendered in early May. World War II was the deadliest conflict in human history, causing between 50 and 80 million deaths, the majority of whom were civilians (approximately 38 to 55 million).

This period was also marked by systematic genocide. In 1942–45, separately from the war-related deaths, the Nazis killed an additional number of over 11 million civilians identified through IBM-enabled censuses, including the majority of the Jews and Gypsies of Europe, millions of Polish and Soviet Slavs, and also homosexuals, Jehovah's Witnesses, misfits, disabled, and political enemies. Meanwhile, in the 1930s the Soviet system of forced labour, expulsions and allegedly engineered famine had a similar death toll. During and after the war millions of civilians were affected by forced population transfers.

Cold War era

The world wars ended the pre-eminent position of Britain, France and Germany in Europe and the world. At the Yalta Conference, Europe was divided into spheres of influence between the victors of World War II, and soon became the principal zone of contention in the Cold War between the two power blocs, the Western countries and the Communist bloc. The United States and the majority of European liberal democracies at the time (United Kingdom, France, Italy, Netherlands, West Germany etc.) established the NATO military alliance. Later, the Soviet Union and its satellites (Bulgaria, Czechoslovakia, East Germany, Hungary, Poland, and Romania) in 1955 established the Warsaw Pact as a counterpoint to NATO. The Warsaw Pact had a much larger ground force, but the American-French-British nuclear umbrellas protected NATO.

Communist states were imposed by the Red Army in the East, while parliamentary democracy became the dominant form of government in the West. Most historians point to its success as the product of exhaustion with war and dictatorship, and the promise of continued economic prosperity. Martin Conway also adds that an important impetus came from the anti-Nazi wartime political coalitions.

Economic recovery

The United States gave away about $20 billion in Marshall Plan grants and other grants and low-interest long-term loans to Western Europe, 1945 to 1951. Historian Michael J. Hogan argues that American aid was critical in stabilizing the economy and politics of Western Europe. It brought in modern management that dramatically increased productivity, and encouraged cooperation between labor and management, and among the member states. Local Communist parties were opposed, and they lost prestige and influence and a role in government. In strategic terms, says Hogan, the Marshall Plan strengthened the West against the possibility of a communist invasion or political takeover. However, the Marshall Plan's role in the rapid recovery has been debated. Most reject the idea that it only miraculously revived Europe, since the evidence shows that a general recovery was already under way thanks to other aid programs from the United States. Economic historians Bradford De Long and Barry Eichengreen conclude it was, " History's Most Successful Structural Adjustment Program." They state:
It was not large enough to have significantly accelerated recovery by financing investment, aiding the reconstruction of damaged infrastructure, or easing commodity bottlenecks. We argue, however, that the Marshall Plan did play a major role in setting the stage for post-World War II Western Europe's rapid growth. The conditions attached to Marshall Plan aid pushed European political economy in a direction that left its post World War II "mixed economies" with more "market" and less "controls" in the mix.

The Soviet Union concentrated on its own recovery. It seized and transferred most of Germany's industrial plants and it exacted war reparations from East Germany, Hungary, Romania, and Bulgaria, using Soviet-dominated joint enterprises. It used trading arrangements deliberately designed to favor the Soviet Union. Moscow controlled the Communist parties that ruled the satellite states, and they followed orders from the Kremlin. Historian Mark Kramer concludes:
The net outflow of resources from eastern Europe to the Soviet Union was approximately $15 billion to $20 billion in the first decade after World War II, an amount roughly equal to the total aid provided by the United States to western Europe under the Marshall Plan.

Western Europe began economic and then political integration, with the aim to unite the region and defend it. This process included organisations such as the European Coal and Steel Community, which grew and evolved into the European Union, and the Council of Europe. The Solidarność movement in the 1980s weakened the Communist government in Poland. At the time the Soviet leader Mikhail Gorbachev initiated perestroika and glasnost, which weakened Soviet influence in Europe, particularly in the USSR. In 1989 after the Pan-European Picnic the Iron Curtain and the Berlin Wall came down and Communist governments outside the Soviet Union were deposed. In 1990 the Federal Republic of Germany absorbed East Germany, after making large cash payments to the USSR. In 1991 the Communist Party of the Soviet Union in Moscow collapsed, ending the USSR, which split into fifteen independent states. The largest, Russia, took the Soviet Union's seat on the United Nations Security Council. The most violent dissolution happened in Yugoslavia, in the Balkans. Four (Slovenia, Croatia, Bosnia and Herzegovina and North Macedonia) out of six Yugoslav republics declared independence and for most of them a violent war ensued, in some parts lasting until 1995. In 2006 Montenegro seceded and became an independent state. In the post–Cold War era, NATO and the EU have been gradually admitting most of the former members of the Warsaw Pact.

Looking at the half century after the war historian Walter Lacquer concluded:
"The postwar generations of European elites aimed to create more democratic societies. They wanted to reduce the extremes of wealth and poverty and provide essential social services in a way that prewar generations had not. They had had quite enough of unrest and conflict. For decades many Continental societies had more or less achieved these aims and had every reason to be proud of their progress. Europe was quiet and civilized. Europe's success was based on recent painful experience: the horrors of two world wars; the lessons of dictatorship; the experiences of fascism and communism. Above all, it was based on a feeling of European identity and common values – or so it appeared at the time."

The post-war period also witnessed a significant rise in the standard of living of the Western European working class. As noted by one historical text, "within a single generation, the working classes of Western Europe came to enjoy the multiple pleasures of the consumer society."

Western Europe's industrial nations in the 1970s were hit by a global economic crisis. They had obsolescent heavy industry, and suddenly had to pay very high energy prices which caused sharp inflation. Some of them also had inefficient nationalized railways and heavy industries. In the important field of computer technology, European nations lagged behind the United States. They also faced high government deficits and growing unrest led by militant labour unions. There was an urgent need for new economic directions. Germany and Sweden sought to create a social consensus behind a gradual restructuring. Germany's efforts proved highly successful. In Britain under the premiership of Margaret Thatcher, the solution was shock therapy, high interest rates, austerity, and selling off inefficient corporations as well as the public housing, which was sold off to the tenants. One result was escalating social tensions in Britain, led by the militant coal miners. Thatcher eventually defeated her opponents and radically changed the British economy, but the controversy never went away as shown by the hostile demonstrations at the time of her death in 2013.

Recent history

The end of the Cold War came in a series of events from 1979 to 1991, mainly in Eastern Europe. In the end, these brought the fall of the Iron Curtain, the German reunification and the end of Soviet control over their Eastern European satellites and their worldwide network of communist parties in a friendly chain reaction from the Pan-European Picnic in 1989. The finals brought the division of the Soviet Union into 15 non-communist states in 1991.
Italian historian Federico Romero reports that observers at the time emphasized that:
The systemic and ideological confrontation between capitalism and communism had faded away. The geopolitical partition of Europe was no more. Nuclear deterrence was morphing into a less armed, almost hypothetical version of its previous self. Superpower rivalry was rapidly wound up with cascading effects in various areas of the world.

Following the end of the Cold War, the European Economic Community pushed for closer integration, co-operation in foreign and home affairs, and started to increase its membership into the neutral and former communist countries. In 1993, the Maastricht Treaty established the European Union, succeeding the EEC and furthering political co-operation. The neutral countries of Austria, Finland and Sweden acceded to the EU, and those that didn't join were tied into the EU's economic market via the European Economic Area. These countries also entered the Schengen Agreement which lifted border controls between member states.

The Maastricht Treaty created a single currency for most EU members. The euro was created in 1999 and replaced all previous currencies in participating states in 2002. The most notable exception to the currency union, or eurozone, was the United Kingdom, which also did not sign the Schengen Agreement.

The EU did not participate in the Yugoslav Wars, and was divided on supporting the United States in the 2003–2011 Iraq War. NATO was part of the war in Afghanistan, but at a much lower level of involvement than the United States.

In 2004, the EU gained 10 new members. (Estonia, Latvia, and Lithuania, which had been part of the Soviet Union; Czech Republic, Hungary, Poland, Slovakia, and Slovenia, five former-communist countries; Malta, and the divided island of Cyprus.) These were followed by Bulgaria and Romania in 2007. Russia's regime had interpreted these expansions as violations against NATO's promise to not expand "one inch to the east" in 1990. Russia engaged in a number of bilateral disputes about gas supplies with Belarus and Ukraine which endangered gas supplies to Europe. Russia also engaged in a minor war with Georgia in 2008.

Supported by the United States and some European countries, Kosovo's government unilaterally declared independence from Serbia on 17 February 2008.

Public opinion in the EU turned against enlargement, partially due to what was seen as over-eager expansion including Turkey gaining candidate status. The European Constitution was rejected in France and the Netherlands, and then (as the Treaty of Lisbon) in Ireland, although a second vote passed in Ireland in 2009.

The financial crisis of 2007–08 affected Europe, and government responded with austerity measures. Limited ability of the smaller EU nations (most notably Greece) to handle their debts led to social unrest, government liquidation, and financial insolvency. In May 2010, the German parliament agreed to loan 22.4 billion euros to Greece over three years, with the stipulation that Greece follow strict austerity measures. See European sovereign-debt crisis.

Beginning in 2014, Ukraine has been in a state of revolution and unrest with two breakaway regions (Donetsk and Lugansk) attempting to join Russia as full federal subjects. (See Russo-Ukrainian War.) On 16 March, a disputed referendum was held in Crimea leading to the de facto secession of Crimea and its largely internationally unrecognized annexation to the Russian Federation as the Republic of Crimea.

In June 2016, in a referendum in the United Kingdom on the country's membership in the European Union, 52% of voters voted to leave the EU, leading to the complex Brexit separation process and negotiations, which led to political and economic changes for both the UK and the remaining European Union countries. The UK left the EU on 31 January 2020. Later that year, Europe was affected by the COVID-19 pandemic.

According to the Wall Street Journal in 2021 as Angela Merkel stepped down as the highly popular Chancellor of Germany after 16 years: Ms. Merkel leaves in her wake a weakened Europe, a region whose aspirations to act as a third superpower have come to seem ever more unrealistic. When she became chancellor in 2005, the EU was at a high point: It had adopted the euro, which was meant to rival the dollar as a global currency, and had just expanded by absorbing former members of the Soviet bloc. Today’s EU, by contrast, is geographically and economically diminished. Having lost the U.K. because of Brexit, it faces deep political and cultural divisions, lags behind in the global race for innovation and technology and is increasingly squeezed by the mounting U.S.-China strategic rivalry. Europe has endured thanks in part to Ms. Merkel’s pragmatic stewardship, but it has been battered by crises during her entire time in office.Russia began an invasion of Ukraine on 24 February 2022, in a major escalation of the Russo-Ukrainian War that began in 2014. It is the largest conventional military attack in Europe since World War II.

Chronology
* 7000 BC: Neolithic in Europe begins.
 3850 BC: Malta's Temple period begins.
 3500 BC: First European civilization, Minoan civilization, begins on Crete.
 3000 BC: Indo-Europeans begin a large-scale settlement of the continent.
 2500 BC: Stonehenge is constructed.
 2100 BC: First European script, Cretan hieroglyphs, is invented by Minoans.
 1750 BC: Mycenaean civilization begins.
 1600 BC: Thera eruption occurs on the island of Santorini, destructing the Minoan city of Thera.
 1450 BC: Crete is conquered by Mycenaeans.
 1200 BC: Late Bronze Age collapse begins.
 1100 BC: Minoan civilization falls.
 1050 BC: Mycenaean civilization falls after a period of palace destruction, marking the beginning of Greek Dark Ages.
 900 BC: Etruscan civilization begins.
 800 BC: Greek Dark Ages end, marking the beginning of classical antiquity.
 753 BC: Traditional year of founding of Rome.
 700 BC: Homer composes The Iliad, an epic poem that represents the first extended work of European literature.
 509 BC: Roman Republic is created.
 499 BC: Greco-Persian Wars begin.
 449 BC: End of Greco-Persian Wars with Greeks defeating Achaemid Empire.
 440 BC: Herodotus defends Athenian political freedom in the Histories.
 404 BC: Sparta wins the Peloponnesian War.
 323 BC: Alexander the Great dies and his Macedonian Empire (reaching far into Asia) fragments.
 264 BC: Punic Wars begin.
 146 BC: Punic Wars end with destruction of Carthage.
 48 BC: Julius Caesar  crosses the Rubicon river, marking the beginning of a civil war.
 44 BC: Julius Caesar is murdered. The Roman Republic enters its terminal crisis.
 27 BC: Establishment of the Roman Empire under Octavian.
AD
 14 AD: Octavian dies.
 30 or 33 AD: Jesus, a popular religious leader, is crucified.
 45–55 (ca): First Christian congregations in mainland Greece and in Rome.
 68: First Roman imperial dynasty, Julio-Claudian, ends with suicide of Nero.
 79: Eruption of Vesuvius occurs, buriing the cities of Pompeii, Herculaneum and Stabiae under the ashes.
 117: Roman Empire reaches its territorial peak.
 166: Antonine Plague begins.
 293: Diocletian reorganizes the Empire by creating the Tetrarchy.
 313: Constantine officially recognises Christianity, marking the end of the persecution of Christians.
 330: Constantine makes Constantinople into his capital, a new Rome.
 370: Huns first enter Europe.
 395: Following the death of Theodosius I, the Empire is permanently split into the Eastern Roman Empire (later Byzantium) and the Western Roman Empire.
 476: Odoacer captures Ravenna and deposes the last Roman emperor in the west: traditionally seen as the end date of the Western Roman Empire.
 527: Justinian I is crowned emperor of Byzantium. Orders the editing of Corpus Juris Civilis, Digest (Roman law).
 597: Beginning of Roman Catholic Christianization of Anglo-Saxon England (missions and churches had been in existence well before this date, but their contacts with Rome had been loose or nonexistent)
 600: Saint Columbanus uses the term "Europe" in a letter.
 655: Jus patronatus.
 681: Khan Asparukh leads the Bulgars and in a union with the numerous local Slavs invades the Byzantine empire in the Battle of Ongal, creating Bulgaria.
 718: Tervel of Bulgaria helps the Byzantine Empire stop the Arabic invasion of Europe, and breaks the siege of Constantinople.
 722: Battle of Covadonga in the Iberian Peninsula. Pelayo, a noble Visigoth, defeats a Muslim army that tried to conquer the Cantabrian coast. This helps establish the Christian Kingdom of Asturias, and marks the beginning of the Reconquista.
 732: At the Battle of Tours, the Franks stop the advance of the Arabs into Europe.
 800: Coronation of Charlemagne as Holy Roman Emperor.
 813: Third Council of Tours: Priests are ordered to preach in the native language of the population.
 843: Treaty of Verdun.
 863: Saints Cyril and Methodius arrive in Great Moravia, initiating Christian mission among the Slav peoples.
 864: Boris I of Bulgaria officially baptises the whole nation, converting the non-Christian population from Tengrism, Slavic and other paganism to Christianity, and officially founding the Bulgarian Church
 872: Unification of Norway.
 886: Bulgarian students of Cyril and Methodius – Sava, Kliment, Naum, Gorazd, Angelariy – arrive back to Bulgaria, creating the Preslav and Ohrid Literary Schools.
 893: The Cyrillic alphabet, developed during the 9th century AD at the Preslav Literary School in the First Bulgarian Empire, becomes the official Bulgarian alphabet.
 895: Hungarian people led by Árpád start to settle in the Carpathian Basin.
 917: In the Battle of Achelous (917) Bulgaria defeats the Byzantine empire, and Simeon I of Bulgaria is proclaimed as emperor, thus Bulgaria becomes an empire.
 962: Otto I of East Francia is crowned as "Emperor" by the Pope, beginning the Holy Roman Empire.
 988 Kievan Rus adopts Christianity, often seen as the origin of the Russian Orthodox Church.
 1054: Start of the East–West Schism, which divides the Christian church for centuries.
 1066: Successful Norman Invasion of England by William the Conqueror.
 1095: Pope Urban II calls for the First Crusade.
 12th century: The 12th century in literature saw an increase in the number of texts. The Renaissance of the 12th century occurs.
 1128: Battle of São Mamede, formation of Portuguese sovereignty.
 1131: Birth of the Kingdom of Sicily
 1185: Bulgarian sovereignty was reestablished with the anti-Byzantine uprising of the Bulgarians and Vlachs
 1250: Death of emperor Frederick II; end of effective ability of emperors to exercise control in Italy.
 1303: The period of the Crusades is over.
 1309–1378: The Avignon Papacy
 1315–1317: The Great Famine of 1315–1317 in Northern Europe
 1341: Petrarch, the "Father of Humanism", becomes the first poet laureate since antiquity.
 1337–1453: The Hundred Years' War between England and France.
 1348–1351: Black Death kills about one-third of Europe's population.
 1439: Johannes Gutenberg invents first movable type and the first printing press for books, starting the Printing Revolution.
 1453: Fall of Constantinople to the Ottoman Turks.
 1487: The Wars of the Roses end.
 1492: The Reconquista ends in the Iberian Peninsula. A Spanish expeditionary group, commanded by Christopher Columbus, lands in the New World.
 1497: Vasco da Gama departs to India starting direct trade with Asia.
 1498: Leonardo da Vinci paints The Last Supper in Milan as the Renaissance flourishes.
 1508: Maximilian I the last ruling "King of the Romans" and the first "elected Emperor of the Romans".
 1517: Martin Luther nails his 95 theses on indulgences to the door of the church in Wittenberg, triggering discussions which would soon lead to the Reformation
 1519: Ferdinand Magellan and Juan Sebastián Elcano begin first global circumnavigation. Their expedition returns in 1522.
 1519: Hernán Cortés begins conquest of Mexico for Spain.
 1532: Francisco Pizarro begins the conquest of Peru (the Inca Empire) for Spain.
 1543: Nicolaus Copernicus publishes De revolutionibus orbium coelestium (On the Revolutions of the Celestial Spheres).
 1547: The Grand Duchy of Moscow becomes the Tsardom of Russia.
 1582: The introduction of the Gregorian calendar; Russia refuses to adopt it until 1918.
 1610: Galileo Galilei uses his telescope to discover the moons of Jupiter.
 1618: The Thirty Years' War brings massive devastation to central Europe.
 1648: The Peace of Westphalia ends the Thirty Years' War, and introduces the principle of the integrity of the nation state.
 1687: Isaac Newton publishes Principia Mathematica, having a profound impact on The Enlightenment.
 1699: Treaty of Karlowitz concludes the Austro-Ottoman War. This marks the end of Ottoman control of Central Europe and the beginning of Ottoman stagnation, establishing the Habsburg monarchy as the dominant power in Central and Southeastern Europe.
 1700: Outbreak of the War of the Spanish Succession and the Great Northern War. The first would check the aspirations of Louis XIV, king of France to dominate European affairs; the second would lead to Russia's emergence as a great power and a recognizably European state.
 18th century: Age of Enlightenment spurs an intellectual renaissance across Europe.
 1707: The Kingdom of Great Britain is formed by the union of the Kingdom of England and the Kingdom of Scotland.
 1712: Thomas Newcomen invents first practical steam engine which begins Industrial Revolution in Britain.
 1721: Foundation of the Russian Empire.
 1775: James Watt invents a new efficient steam engine accelerating the Industrial Revolution in Britain.
 1776: Adam Smith publishes The Wealth of Nations. 
 1784: Immanuel Kant publishes Answering the Question: What Is Enlightenment?.
 1789: Beginning of the French Revolution and end of the absolute monarchy in France.
 1792–1802: French Revolutionary Wars.
 1799: Napoleon comes to power, eventually consolidating his position as Emperor of the French.
 1803–1815: Napoleonic Wars end in defeat of Napoleon.
 1806: Napoleon abolishes the Holy Roman Empire.
 1814–1815: Congress of Vienna; Treaty of Vienna; France is reduced to 1789 boundaries; Reactionary forces dominate across Europe.
 1825: George Stephenson opens the Stockton and Darlington Railway the first steam train railway for passenger traffic in the world.
 1830: The southern provinces secede from the United Kingdom of the Netherlands in the Belgian Revolution.
 1836: Louis Daguerre invents first practical photographic method, in effect the first camera.
 1838: , the first steamship built for regularly scheduled transatlantic crossings enters service.
 1848: Revolutions of 1848 and publication of The Communist Manifesto.
 1852: Start of the Crimean War, which ends in 1855 in a defeat for Russia.
 1859: Charles Darwin publishes On the Origin of Species.
 1861: Unification of Italy after victories by Giuseppe Garibaldi.
 1866: First commercially successful transatlantic telegraph cable is completed.
 1860s: Russia emancipates its serfs and Karl Marx completes the first volume of Das Kapital.
 1870: Franco-Prussian War and the fall of the Second French Empire.
 1871: Unification of Germany under the direction of Otto von Bismarck.
 1873: Panic of 1873 occurs. The Long Depression begins.
 1878: Re-establishment of Bulgaria, independence of Serbia, Montenegro and Romania
 1885: Karl Benz invents Benz Patent-Motorwagen, the world's first automobile.
 1885: First permanent citywide electrical tram system in Europe (in Sarajevo).
 1895: Auguste and Louis Lumière begin exhibitions of projected films before the paying public with their cinematograph, a portable camera, printer, and projector.
 1902: Guglielmo Marconi sends first transatlantic radio transmission.
 1914: Archduke Franz Ferdinand of Austria is assassinated; World War I begins.
 1917: Vladimir Lenin and the Bolsheviks seize power in the Russian Revolution. The ensuing Russian Civil War lasts until 1922.
 1918: World War I ends with the defeat of Germany and the Central Powers. Ten million soldiers killed; collapse of Russian, German, Austrian, and Ottoman empires.
 1918: Collapse of the German Empire and monarchic system; founding of Weimar Republic.
 1918: Worldwide Spanish flu epidemic kills millions in Europe.
 1918: Austro-Hungarian Empire dissolves.
 1919: Versailles Treaty strips Germany of its colonies, several provinces and its navy and air force; limits army; Allies occupy western areas; reparations ordered.
 1920: League of Nations begins operations; largely ineffective; defunct by 1939.
 1921–22: Ireland divided; Irish Free State becomes independent and civil war erupts.
 1922: Benito Mussolini and the Fascists take power in Italy.
 1929: Worldwide Great Depression begins with stock market crash in New York City.
 1933: Adolf Hitler and the Nazis take power in Germany.
 1935: Italy conquers Ethiopia; League sanctions are ineffective.
 1936: Start of the Spanish Civil War; ends in 1939 with victory of Nationalists who are aided by Germany and Italy.
 1938: Germany escalates the persecution of Jews with Kristallnacht.
 1938: Appeasement of Germany by Britain and France; Munich agreement splits Czechoslovakia; Germany seized the remainder in 1939.
 1939: Britain and France hurriedly rearm; failed to arrange treaty with USSR.
 1939: Adolf Hitler and Joseph Stalin agree partition of Eastern Europe in Molotov–Ribbentrop Pact.
 1939: Nazi Germany invades Poland, starting the Second World War.
 1940: Great Britain under Winston Churchill becomes the last nation to hold out against the Nazis after winning the Battle of Britain.
 1941: U.S. begins large-scale lend-lease aid to Britain, Free France, the USSR and other Allies; Canada also provides financial aid.
 1941: Germany invades the Soviet Union in Operation Barbarossa; fails to capture Moscow or Leningrad.
 1942: Adolf Hitler and Nazi Germany commence the Holocaust – a Final Solution, with the murder of 6 million Jews.
 1943: After Stalingrad and Kursk, Soviet forces begin recapturing Nazi-occupied territory in the East.
 1944: U.S., British and Canadian armed forces invade Nazi-occupied France at Normandy.
 1945: Hitler commits suicide, Mussolini is executed. World War II ends with Europe in ruins and Germany defeated.
 1945: United Nations formed.
 1947: The British Empire begins a process of voluntarily dismantling with the granting of independence to India and Pakistan.
 1947: Cold War begins as Europe is polarized East versus West.
 1948–1951: U.S. provides large sums to rebuild Western Europe through the Marshall Plan; stimulates large-scale modernization of European industries and reduction of trade restrictions.
 1949: The NATO alliance is established.
 1955: USSR creates a rival military coalition, the Warsaw Pact.
 1950: The Schuman Declaration begins the process of European integration.
 1954: The French Empire begins to be dismantled; Withdraws from Vietnam.
 1956: Suez Crisis signals the end of the effective power of the British Empire.
 1956: Hungarian Uprising defeated by Soviet military forces.
 1957: Treaties of Rome establish the European Economic Community from 1958.
 1962: The Second Vatican Council opens and begins a period of reform in the Catholic Church
 1968: The May 1968 events in France lead France to the brink of revolution.
 1968: The Prague Spring is defeated by Warsaw Pact military forces. The Club of Rome is founded.
 1980: The Solidarność movement under Lech Wałęsa begins open, overground opposition to the Communist rule in Poland.
 1985: Mikhail Gorbachev becomes leader of the Soviet Union and begins reforms which inadvertently leads to the fall of Communism and the Soviet Union.
 1986: Chernobyl disaster occurs, the worst nuclear disaster in history.
 1989: Communism overthrown in all the Warsaw Pact countries except the Soviet Union. Fall of the Berlin Wall (opening of unrestrained border crossings between east and west, which effectively deprived the wall of any relevance).
 1990: Reunification of Germany.
 1991: Breakup of Yugoslavia and the beginning of the Yugoslav Wars.
 1991: Dissolution of the Soviet Union and the creation of the Commonwealth of Independent States.
 1993: Maastricht Treaty establishes the European Union.
 1997–99: End of European colonial empires in Asia with the handover of Hong Kong and Macau to China.
 2004: Slovenia, Hungary, the Czech Republic, Slovakia, Poland, Lithuania, Latvia, Estonia, Cyprus and Malta join the European Union.
 2007: Romania and Bulgaria join the European Union.
 2008: The Great Recession begins. Unemployment rises in some parts of Europe.
 2013: Croatia joins the European Union.
 2014: Revolution of Dignity in Ukraine and the beginning of the Russo-Ukrainian War.
 2015: European migrant crisis starts.
 2020: The United Kingdom leaves the European Union.
 2020-ongoing: COVID-19 pandemic in Europe, countries with the most cases are Russia, the United Kingdom, France, Spain, and Italy.
 2022: Russian invasion of Ukraine opens with some of the most intense combat operations in Europe since the end of the Cold War.

See also 
 Prehistoric Europe
 Hellenistic period
 Roman Empire
 Byzantine Empire
 Middle Ages
 Renaissance
 Age of Discovery
 Major explorations after the Age of Discovery
 Colonialism
 Age of Enlightenment
 Atlantic Revolutions
 Rise of nationalism in Europe
 Industrial Revolution
 House of European History, Museum scheduled to open in 2016 in Brussels
 List of historians, inclusive of most major historians
 List of history journals#Europe
 List of largest European cities in history
 List of predecessors of sovereign states in Europe
 List of sovereign states by date of formation § Europe
 Timeline of sovereign states in Europe
 List of empires
 List of medieval great powers
 List of modern great powers 
 Atlantic World
 History of the Mediterranean region
 History of Western civilization
 History of the Balkans
 Timeline of European Union history
 Genetic history of Europe
 History of the Romani people

References

Bibliography

Surveys
 Blum, Jerome et al. The European World (2 vol. 2nd ed. 1970) university textbook; online
 Davies, Norman. Europe: A History (1998), advanced university textbook
 Gay, Peter and R.K. Webb Modern Europe: To 1815 (1973) online, university textbook
 Gay, Peter and R.K. Webb Modern Europe: Since 1815 (1973), university textbook
 Gooch, Brison D. ed. Interpreting European history. 1: From the renaissance to Napoleon (1967) online and Interpreting European history 2: from Metternich to Present (1967). online; readings by scholars 
 McKay, John P. et al. A History of Western Society (13th ed.; 2 vol 2020) 1300 pp; university textbook
 Moncure, James A. ed. Research Guide to European Historical Biography: 1450–Present (4 vol 1992); 2140 pp; historiographical guide to 200 major political and military leaders
 Roberts, J.M. The Penguin History of Europe (1998), survey;  excerpt
 Simms, Brendan. Europe: The Struggle for Supremacy, from 1453 to the Present (2013), survey, with emphasis on Germany
 Stearns, Peter, ed. The Encyclopedia of World History (2001); comprehensive global coverage

Geography and atlases
 Cambridge Modern History Atlas (1912) online free. 141 maps
 Catchpole, Brian. Map History of the Modern World (1982)
 Darby, H. C., and H. Fullard, eds. The New Cambridge Modern History, Vol. 14: Atlas (1970)
 East, W. Gordon. An Historical Geography of Europe (4th ed. 1950)
 Haywood, John. Atlas of world history (1997) online free
 Horrabin, J.F. An Atlas History of the Second Great War (9 vol 1941–45) 7 vol online free
 Kinder, Hermann and Werner Hilgemann. Anchor Atlas of World History (2 vol. 1978); advanced analytical maps, mostly of Europe
 O'Brian, Patrick K. Atlas of World History (2007) Online free
 
 Rand McNally Atlas of World History (1983), maps #76-81. Published in Britain as the Hamlyn Historical Atlas online free
 Robertson, Charles Grant. An historical atlas of modern Europe from 1789 to 1922 with an historical and explanatory text (1922) online free
 Schenk, Frithjof Benjamin, Mental Maps: The Cognitive Mapping of the Continent as an Object of Research of European History, EGO – European History Online, Mainz: Institute of European History, 2013, retrieved: 4 March 2020
 Talbert, Richard J.A. Barrington Atlas of the Greek and Roman World for iPad (Princeton UP 2014) ; 102 interactive color maps from archaic Greece to the Late Roman Empire.
 Historical Atlas Wikipedia maps; no copyright
 Atlas of Germany Wikipedia maps; no copyright

Major nations
 
 Carr, Raymond, ed. Spain: A history (2000)
 Clark, Christopher M. Iron kingdom: the rise and downfall of Prussia, 1600-1947 (2006)
 Davies, Norman. The Isles: A History (2001), Britain and Ireland
 
 Fraser, Rebecca. The Story of Britain: From the Romans to the Present: A Narrative History (2006)
 Holborn, Hajo. vol 1: A History of Modern Germany: The Reformation; vol 2: A History of Modern Germany: 1648-1840; vol 3: A history of modern Germany: 1840–1945 (1959). a standard scholarly survey.
 Kamen, Henry. A concise history of Spain (1973)
 
 Holmes, George, ed. The Oxford illustrated history of medieval Europe (2001).
 Holmes, George, ed. The Oxford illustrated history of Italy (1997)
 Jones, Colin. The Cambridge Illustrated History of France (1999)
 Kitchen, Martin The Cambridge Illustrated History of Germany (1996).
 Morgan, Kenneth O., ed. The Oxford illustrated history of Britain (1984)
 
 Riasanovsky, Nicholas V., and Mark D. Steinberg. A History of Russia (2 vol. 2010)
 Sagarra, Eda. A social history of Germany (2003)
 Tombs, Robert, The English and their History (2014) advanced history; online review

Classical
 Boardman, John, et al. eds. The Oxford History of Greece and the Hellenistic World (2nd ed. 2002) 520 pp
 Boardman, John, et al. eds. The Oxford History of the Roman World (2001)
 Cartledge, Paul. The Cambridge Illustrated History of Ancient Greece (2002)

Late Roman
 Heather, Peter. Empires and Barbarians: The Fall of Rome and the Birth of Europe (Oxford University Press; 2010); 734 pages; Examines the migrations, trade, and other phenomena that shaped a recognizable entity of Europe in the first millennium.
 Jones, A.H.M. The Later Roman Empire, 284–602: A Social, Economic, and Administrative Survey (2 Vol. 1964)
 Mitchell, Stephen. A History of the Later Roman Empire, AD 284–641: The Transformation of the Ancient World (2006)

Medieval
 
 
 Davis, R.H.C. A History of Medieval Europe (2nd ed. 2000)
 Ferguson, Wallace K. Europe in Transition, 1300–1520 (1962) 
 Hanawalt, Barbara. The Middle Ages: An Illustrated History (1999)
 Holmes, George, ed. The Oxford Illustrated History of Medieval Europe (2001)
 Koenigsberger, H.G. Medieval Europe 400–1500 (1987)
 Riddle, John M. A history of the Middle Ages, 300–1500 (2008)

Early modern
 
 Cameron, Euan. Early Modern Europe: An Oxford History (2001)
 Friedrich, Carl J. The Age of the Baroque, 1610-1660 (1962); Despite the title, this is a wide-ranging Social, cultural, political and diplomatic history of Europe; 14-day borrowing copy
 Hesmyr, Atle. Scandinavia in the Early Modern Era; From Peasant Revolts and Witch Hunts to Constitution Drafting Yeomen (2014)
 
 Rice, Eugene F. The Foundations of Early Modern Europe, 1460-1559 (2nd ed. 1994) 240 pp
 Merriman, John. A History of Modern Europe: From the Renaissance to the Present (3rd ed. 2010, 2 vol), 1412 pp online 
 Scott, Hamish, ed. The Oxford Handbook of Early Modern European History, 1350–1750: Volume I: Peoples and Place (2015).
 
 Stoye, John. Europe Unfolding, 1648-1688 (2nd ed. 2000).
 
 Wiesner, Merry E. Early Modern Europe, 1450-1789 (Cambridge History of Europe) (2006)

19th century
 Anderson, M.S. The Ascendancy of Europe: 1815-1914 (3rd ed. 2003)
 Berger, Stefan, ed. A Companion to Nineteenth-Century Europe, 1789–1914 (2006), 545pp; emphasis on historiography of 32 topics; online
 Blanning, T.C.W. ed. The Nineteenth Century: Europe 1789–1914 (Short Oxford History of Europe) (2000) 320 pp
 Brinton, Crane. A Decade of Revolution, 1789–1799 (1934) online in Langer series on history of Europe.
 Bruun, Geoffrey. Europe and the French Imperium, 1799–1814 (1938) online.
 Cameron, Rondo. France and the Economic Development of Europe, 1800–1914: Conquests of Peace and Seeds of War (1961), wide-ranging economic and business history. online
 Evans, Richard J. The Pursuit of Power: Europe 1815–1914 (2016), 934 pp; scholarly survey
 Gildea, Robert. Barricades and Borders: Europe 1800–1914 (Short Oxford History of the Modern World) (3rd ed. 2003) 544 p 
 Gooch, Brison D. Europe in the nineteenth century; a history (1970) online
 
 Kertesz, G.A. ed Documents in the Political History of the European Continent 1815-1939 (1968), 507 pp; several hundred short documents; primary sources
 Mason, David S. A Concise History of Modern Europe: Liberty, Equality, Solidarity (2011), since 1700
 Merriman, John, and J.M. Winter, eds. Europe 1789 to 1914: Encyclopedia of the Age of Industry and Empire (5 vol. 2006)
 Ramm, Agatha. Europe in the Nineteenth Century 1789–1905 (1984). 1950 edition online
 Richardson, Hubert N.B. A Dictionary of Napoleon and His Times (1921) online free 489 pp
 Steinberg, Jonathan. Bismarck: A Life (2011)
 Salmi, Hannu. 19th Century Europe: A Cultural History (2008).
 Taylor, A.J.P. The Struggle for Mastery in Europe 1848-1918 (1954) online free; Advanced diplomatic history online
 Thomson, David. Europe Since Napoleon (1923) 524 pp online

Since 1900
 Brose, Eric Dorn. A History of Europe in the Twentieth Century (2004) 548 pp
 Brown, Archie. The Rise and Fall of Communism (2009), global
 Buchanan, Tom. Europe's Troubled Peace: 1945 to the Present (Blackwell History of Europe) (2012)
 Cook, Bernard A. Europe Since 1945: An Encyclopedia (2 vol; 2001), 1465 pp
 Davies, Norman. Europe at War 1939-1945: No Simple Victory (2008)
 Dear, I.C.B. and M.R.D. Foot, eds. The Oxford Companion to World War II (2006)
 Frank, Matthew. Making Minorities History: Population Transfer in Twentieth-Century Europe (Oxford UP, 2017). 464 pp. online review
 Grenville, J.A.S. A History of the World in the Twentieth Century (1994). online free
 Hallock, Stephanie A. The World in the 20th Century: A Thematic Approach (2012)
 
 Judt, Tony. Postwar: A History of Europe Since 1945 (2006)
 Martel, Gordon, ed. A Companion to Europe, 1900-1950 (2011) 32 essays by scholars; emphasis on historiography
 Mazower, Mark. Dark Continent: Europe's Twentieth Century (2000) 512 pp
 Merriman, John, and Jay Winter, eds. Europe Since 1914: Encyclopedia of the Age War and Reconstruction (5 vol. 2006)
 
 Paxton, Robert O., and Julie Hessler. Europe in the twentieth century (5th edition 2011.
 Pollard, Sidney, ed. Wealth and Poverty: an Economic History of the 20th Century (1990), 260 pp; global perspective online free
 Sontag, Raymond James. A broken world, 1919–1939 (1972), wide-ranging history of interwar Europe; online free to borrow
 Stone, Dan, ed. The Oxford Handbook of Postwar European History (2015).
 Ther, Philipp. Europe since 1989: A History (Princeton UP, 2016) excerpt, 440 pp
 Toynbee, Arnold, ed. Survey Of International Affairs: Hitler's Europe 1939–1946 (1954) online
 Wasserstein, Bernard. Barbarism and civilization: A history of Europe in our time (2007), since 1914 online
 , on World War II

Agriculture and economy
 
 Berend, Iván T. An Economic History of Twentieth-Century Europe (2013)
 
 
 
 Gras, Norman. A history of agriculture in Europe and America (1925). online 
 Kander, Astrid, et al. Power to the People: Energy in Europe Over the Last Five Centuries (Princeton UP, 2013)
 Milward, Alan S. and S.B. Saul. The Development of the Economies of Continental Europe: 1850–1914 (1977) online
 Murray, Jacqueline. The First European Agriculture (1970)
 Pollard, Sidney, ed. Wealth and Poverty: an Economic History of the 20th Century (1990), 260 pp; global perspective online free
 Pounds, N.J.G. An Economic History of Medieval Europe (1994)
 Slicher van Bath, B.H. The agrarian history of Western Europe, AD 500–1850 (1966)
 Thorp, William Long. Business Annals: United States, England, France, Germany, Austria, Russia, Sweden, Netherlands, Italy, Argentina, Brazil, Canada, South Africa, Australia, India, Japan, China (1926) capsule summary of conditions in each country for each quarter-year 1790–1925 online

Diplomacy
 Albrecht-Carrié, René. A Diplomatic History of Europe Since the Congress of Vienna (1958), 736pp; a basic introduction, 1815–1955 online 
 Black, Jeremy. A History of Diplomacy (2011)
 
 Kertesz, G.A. ed Documents in the Political History of the European Continent 1815-1939 (1968), 507 pp; several hundred short documents
 Langer, William. An Encyclopedia of World History (5th ed. 1973), very detailed outline
 Macmillan, Margaret. The War That Ended Peace: The Road to 1914 (2013) cover 1890s to 1914
 Mowat, R.B. History of European Diplomacy, 1451–1789 (1928) 324 pages 
 Petrie, Charles. Earlier diplomatic history, 1492–1713 (1949), covers all of Europe; online
 Petrie, Charles. Diplomatic History, 1713–1933 (1946), broad summary online
 Schroeder, Paul. The Transformation of European Politics 1763–1848 (1994) online; advanced diplomatic history
 Sontag, Raymond James. European Diplomatic History 1871–1932 (1933) online
 Steiner, Zara. The Lights that Failed: European International History 1919–1933 (2007)
 Steiner, Zara. The Triumph of the Dark: European International History 1933–1939 (2011)
 Taylor, A.J.P The struggle for mastery in Europe, 1848–1918 (1954) online

Empires and interactions
 Bayly, C.A. ed. Atlas of the British Empire (1989). survey by scholars; heavily illustrated
 Brendon, Piers. The Decline and Fall of the British Empire, 1781–1997 (2008), wide-ranging survey
 Cotterell, Arthur. Western Power in Asia: Its Slow Rise and Swift Fall, 1415 – 1999 (2009) popular history; excerpt
 Darwin, John. After Tamerlane: The Rise and Fall of Global Empires, 1400–2000 (2008).
 James, Lawrence. The Rise and Fall of the British Empire (1997)
 Poddar, Prem, and Lars Jensen, eds., A historical companion to postcolonial literatures: Continental Europe and Its Empires (Edinburgh UP, 2008), excerpt also entire text online
 

Ideas and science
 Heilbron, John L., ed. The Oxford Companion to the History of Modern Science (2003)
 
 Wiener, Philip P. Dictionary of the History of Ideas (5 vol 1973)

Religion
 Forlenza, Rosario. "New Perspectives on Twentieth-Century Catholicism." Contemporary European History 28.4 (2019): 581–595 DOI: https://doi.org/10.1017/S0960777319000146
 Latourette, Kenneth Scott. Christianity in a Revolutionary Age: A History of Christianity in the Nineteenth and Twentieth Centuries (5 vol. 1958–69) vol 1, 2, and 4 for detailed country-by-country coverage
 MacCulloch, Diarmaid. Christianity: The First Three Thousand Years (2011)

Social
 
 Maynes, Mary Jo. Schooling in Western Europe: A social history (1985).
 Patel, Klaus Kiran, Transnational History, EGO – European History Online, Mainz: Institute of European History, 2010, retrieved: 4 March 2020
 
 Schmale, Wolfgang, A Transcultural History of Europe – Perspectives from the History of Migration, EGO – European History Online, Mainz: Institute of European History, 2010, retrieved: 4 March 2020
 Stearns, Peter N., ed. Encyclopedia of European Social History (6 vol 2000), 3000 pp comprehensive coverage
 Stearns, Peter N., and Herrick Chapman. European society in upheaval: social history since 1750 (1975).
 Tipton, F. and Robert Aldrich. An Economic and Social History of Europe (1987), two volumes
 
 

Warfare
 Archer, Christon I.; John R. Ferris, Holger H. Herwig. World History of Warfare (2002)
 The Cambridge History of the First World War (3 vol 2014) online 
 The Cambridge History of the Second World War (3 vol 2015) online 
 Cruttwell, C. R. M. F. A History of the Great War, 1914–1918 (1934), general military history online free
 
 Dupuy, R. Ernest, The Harper Encyclopedia of Military History: From 3500 BC to the Present (1993)
 Gerwarth, Robert, and Erez Manela. "The Great War as a Global War: Imperial Conflict and the Reconfiguration of World Order, 1911–1923." Diplomatic History 38.4 (2014): 786–800. online
 Gerwarth, Robert, and Erez Manela, eds. Empires at War: 1911–1923 (2014), 12 very wide-ranging essays by scholars.  excerpt
 Goldsworthy, Adrian, and John Keegan. Roman Warfare (2000)
 Horne, John, ed. A Companion to World War I (2012)
 Keegan, John. A History of Warfare (1994) online
 Kennedy, Paul. The Rise and Fall of the Great Powers (1989) online
 Muehlbauer, Matthew S., and David J. Ulbrich, eds. The Routledge History of Global War and Society (Routledge, 2018)
 Paret, Peter, ed. Makers of Modern Strategy (1986), ideas of warfare
 
 Sharman, Jason C. "Myths of military revolution: European expansion and Eurocentrism." European Journal of International Relations 24.3 (2018): 491-513 online
 Stevenson, David. Cataclysm: The First World War As Political Tragedy (2004) major reinterpretation, 560pp
 Strachan, Hew. The First World War: Volume I: To Arms (2004): a major scholarly synthesis. Thorough coverage of 1914–16; 1245pp
 ; comprehensive overview with emphasis on diplomacy
 Winter, J. M. The Experience of World War I (2nd ed 2005), topical essays;
 Winter, Jay, and Antoine Prost (2nd ed 2020). The Great War in History: Debates and Controversies, 1914 to the Present. New York: Cambridge University Press. 
 Winter, Jay. Remembering War: The Great War Between Memory and History in the Twentieth Century. (Yale University Press, 2006)
 Winter, Jay, ed. (2014). The Cambridge History of the First World War (2 vol. Cambridge University Press, 2014) 
 Zeiler, Thomas W. and Daniel M. DuBois, eds. A Companion to World War II (2 vol 2013), 1030 pp; comprehensive overview by scholars

Women and gender
 Anderson, Bonnie S. and Judith P. Zinsser. A History of Their Own: Women in Europe from Prehistory to the Present (2nd ed 2000)
 Bridenthal, Renate, et al. eds. Becoming Visible: Women in European History (3rd ed. 1997), 608 pp; essays by scholars
 Frey, Linda, Marsha Frey, Joanne Schneider. Women in Western European History: A Select Chronological, Geographical, and Topical Bibliography (1982) 
 Hufton, Olwen. The Prospect Before Her: A History of Women in Western Europe, 1500–1800'' (1996)

External links

 EurhistXX: The Network for the Contemporary History of Europe, edited in English from Berlin
 Contains information on historical trends in living standards in various European countries
 European History Primary Sources Online access to primary sources for historians
 
 Vistorica – Timelines of European modern history